= Kennedy Space Center Launch Complex 39 =

Historic Apollo Moonport

Launch Complex 39
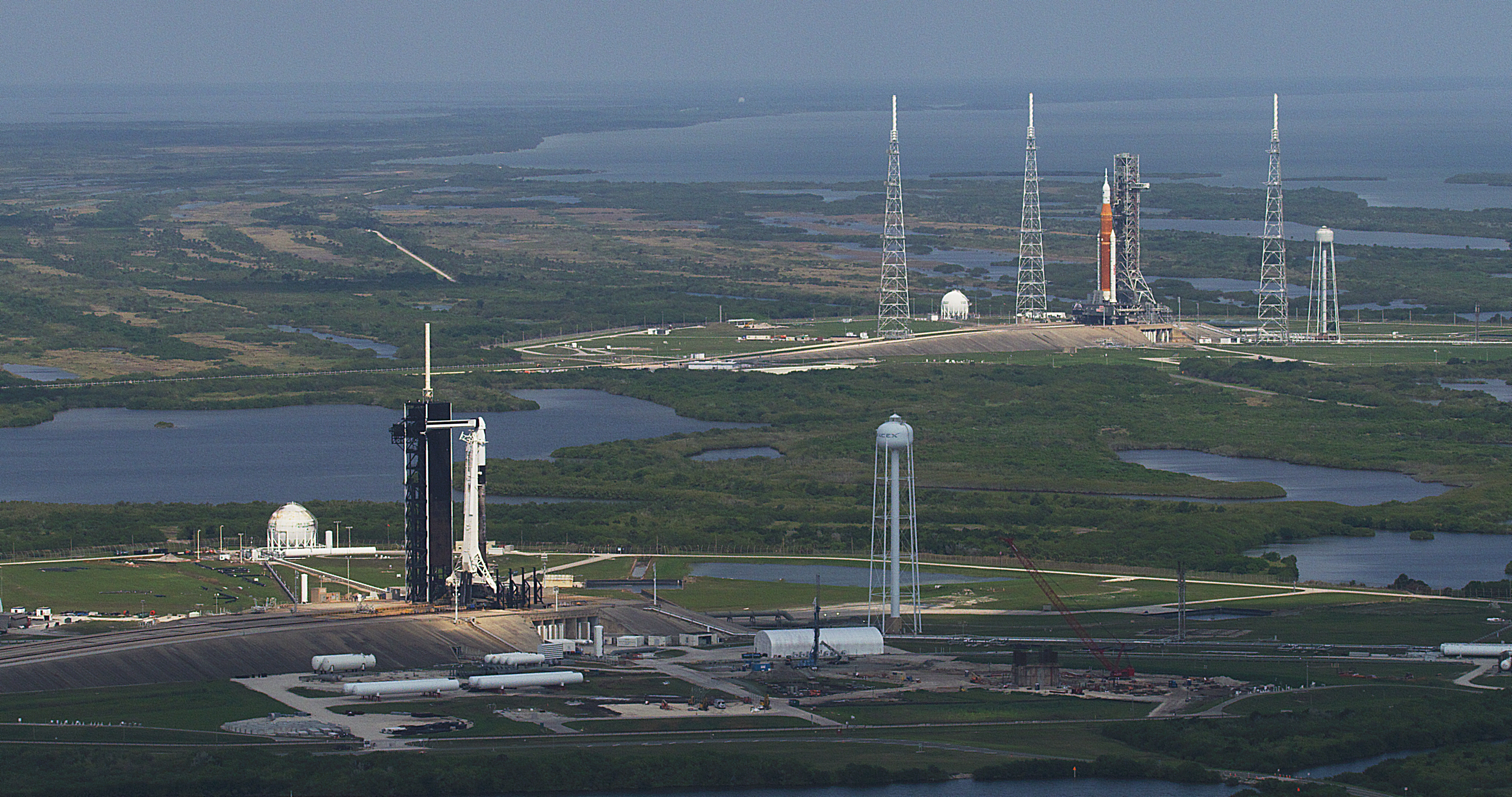
- LC-39A (foreground) and LC-39B (background) on April 6, 2022
- Interactive map of Launch Complex 39
- Location: Kennedy Space Center
- Coordinates: 28°36′30.2″N 80°36′15.6″W
- Time zone: UTC−05:00 (EST)
  - Summer (DST): UTC−04:00 (EDT)
- Short name: LC-39
- Established: 1962; 64 years ago
- Operator: Owner: NASA; Tenants: Boeing (OPF-3); NASA (LC-39B, LCC, VAB); SpaceX (LC-39A); United States Space Force (OPF-1, OPF-2)
- Total launches: 283 (13 Saturn V, 4 Saturn IB, 135 Shuttle, 1 Ares I, 114 Falcon 9, 14 Falcon Heavy, 2 Space Launch System)
- Launch pad: 4, plus 2 landing sites
- Orbital inclination range: 28°–62°
Pad 39A (main) launch history
- Status: Active
- Launches: 222 (12 Saturn V, 82 Shuttle, 114 Falcon 9, 14 Falcon Heavy)
- First launch: November 9, 1967; Saturn V (Apollo 4)
- Last launch: October 2, 2026; Falcon Heavy (NROL-97)
- Associated rockets: Current: Falcon 9, Falcon Heavy; Retired: Saturn V, Space Shuttle; Plans cancelled: Ares V
Pad 39B launch history
- Status: Active
- Launches: 61 (1 Saturn V, 4 Saturn IB, 53 Shuttle, 1 Ares I-X, 2 SLS)
- First launch: May 18, 1969; Saturn V (Apollo 10)
- Last launch: April 1, 2026; Space Launch System (Artemis II)
- Associated rockets: Current: Space Launch System; Retired: Saturn V, Saturn IB, Space Shuttle, Ares I-X; Plans cancelled: Ares I, OmegA
Pad 39C launch history
- Status: Unused, functions transferred to LC-48
- Launches: 0
Pad 39A OLP-x launch history
- Status: Under Construction
- Associated rockets: Future: Starship
Pad 39A LZ-x landing history
- Status: Planned
- Associated rockets: Future: Falcon 9, Falcon Heavy
Pad 39A LZ-x landing history
- Status: Planned
- Associated rockets: Future: Falcon 9, Falcon Heavy
- Launch Complex 39
- U.S. National Register of Historic Places
- Location within Florida Location within the United States
- Location: John F. Kennedy Space Center, Titusville, Florida
- Area: 7,000 acres (2,800 ha)
- Built: 1967
- MPS: John F. Kennedy Space Center MPS
- NRHP reference No.: 73000568
- Added to NRHP: May 24, 1973

Launch Complex 39 (LC-39) is a rocket launch site at the John F. Kennedy Space Center on Merritt Island in Florida, United States. The site and its collection of facilities were originally built as the Apollo program's "Moonport" It was later modified for the Space Shuttle program, and now is used for Artemis missions. Launch Complex 39 consists of three launch sub-complexes or "pads"—39A, 39B, and 39C—a Vehicle Assembly Building (VAB), a Crawlerway used by crawler-transporters to carry mobile launcher platforms between the VAB and the pads, Orbiter Processing Facility buildings, a Launch Control Center which contains the firing rooms, a news facility famous for the iconic countdown clock seen in television coverage and photos, and various logistical and operational support buildings.

SpaceX has leased Launch Complex 39A from NASA since 2014 and has modified the pad to support Falcon 9 and Falcon Heavy launches. NASA began modifying Launch Complex 39B in 2007 to accommodate the now defunct Constellation program, and is currently launching the Artemis program, which was first launched in November 2022. A pad to be designated 39C, which would have been a copy of pads 39A and 39B, was originally planned for Apollo but never built. A smaller pad, also designated 39C, was constructed from January to June 2015, to accommodate small-lift launch vehicles.

NASA launches from pads 39A and 39B have been supervised from the NASA Launch Control Center, located 3 miles (4.8 km) from the launch pads. LC-39 is one of several launch sites that share the radar and tracking services of the Eastern Test Range.

== History ==
=== Early history ===
Northern Merritt Island was first developed around 1890 when a few wealthy Harvard University graduates purchased 18,000 acres (73 km^{2}) and constructed a three-story mahogany clubhouse, very nearly on the site of Pad 39A. During the 1920s, Peter E. Studebaker Jr., son of the automobile magnate, built a small casino at De Soto Beach eight miles (13 km) north of the Canaveral lighthouse.

In 1948, the Navy transferred the former Banana River Naval Air Station, located south of Cape Canaveral, to the Air Force for use in testing captured German V-2 rockets. The site's location on the East Florida coast was ideal for this purpose, in that launches would be over the ocean, away from populated areas. This site became the Joint Long Range Proving Ground in 1949 and was renamed Patrick Air Force Base in 1950 and Patrick Space Force Base in 2020. The Air Force annexed part of Cape Canaveral, to the north, in 1951, forming the Air Force Missile Test Center, the future Cape Canaveral Space Force Station (CCSFS). Missile and rocketry testing and development would take place here through the 1950s.

After the creation of NASA in 1958, the CCAFS launch pads were used for NASA's civilian uncrewed and crewed launches, including those of Project Mercury and Project Gemini.

=== Apollo and Skylab ===
In 1961, President Kennedy proposed to Congress the goal of landing a man on the Moon by the end of the decade. Congressional approval led to the launch of the Apollo program, which required a massive expansion of NASA operations, including an expansion of launch operations from the Cape to adjacent Merritt Island to the north and west. NASA began acquisition of land in 1962, taking title to 131 square miles (340 km^{2}) by outright purchase and negotiating with the state of Florida for an additional 87 square miles (230 km^{2}). On July 1, 1962, the site was named the Launch Operations Center.

==== Initial design ====
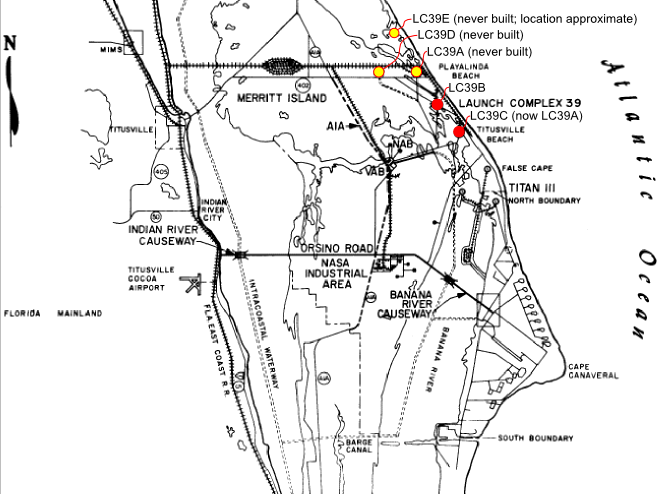
Launch Complex Plan – 1963

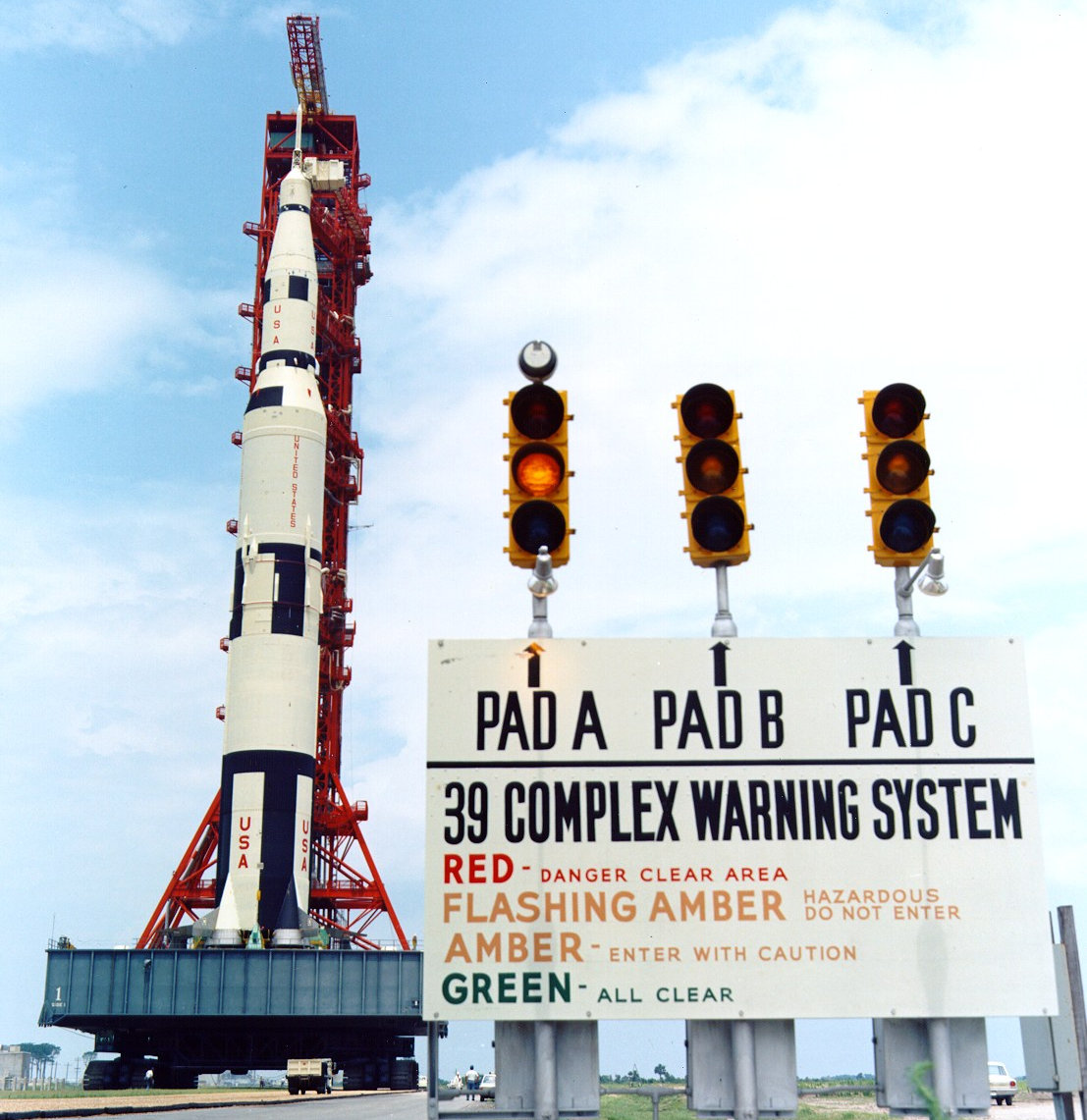
Complex Warning System – 1966

The need for a new launch complex was first considered in 1961. At the time, the highest-numbered launch pad at CCAFS was Launch Complex 37. A proposed Launch Complex 38 had been set aside for the future expansion of the Atlas-Centaur program, but ultimately never built. The new complex was thus designated Launch Complex 39.

The method of reaching the Moon had not yet been decided. The two leading alternatives were direct ascent, which launched a single huge rocket; and Earth orbit rendezvous, where two or more launches of smaller rockets would place several parts of the lunar departure spacecraft which would be assembled in orbit. The former would require a huge Nova-class launcher and pads, while the latter would require several rockets to be launched in quick succession. Furthermore, the selection of the actual rockets was still ongoing; NASA was proposing the Nova design while their newly-acquired former Army group in Huntsville Alabama had proposed a series of slightly smaller designs known as Saturn.

This complicated the design of the launch complex, as it had to encompass two very different possibilities and rockets. Accordingly, early designs from 1961 show two sets of launch pads. The first was a series of three pads for Saturn along Playalinda Beach, with the southernmost near the current Eddy Creek Boat Launch, and the northernmost around Klondike Beach. Far to the south was a similar set of three pads for Nova, the southernmost just south of the Astronaut Beach House and the northern roughly at the location of the current Pad A.

The final selection of lunar orbit rendezvous and the Saturn V led to numerous changes. The Nova pads disappeared, and the three Saturn pads were moved southward. The southernmost was now at the current location of Pad A, while the northernmost was located between Patrol Road, the current boundary road for the LC39 site, and Playlandia Beach Road on the north. At the time, the original three were named from north to south: Pad A through Pad C. The pads were evenly spaced 8,700 feet (2,700 m) apart to avoid damage in the event of an explosion on a pad.

In March 1963, plans were formalized to build only two of the three pads; the northernmost, furthest from the VAB, would not be built but reserved for future expansion. As the original Pad A would no longer be built, the naming was changed to run south-to-north, so that the two pads that would be built would be A and B. If the original 39A at the north end were ever built, it would now be known as 39C.

Some consideration for C's construction was made: the Crawlerway initially splits off from A toward B running north-northwest, and then bends north toward B a short distance north at Cochran Cove. Continuing straight north-northeast would have led to C after a similar northward bend. The original construction of the Crawlerway included an interchange between B and a short part of the extension northward for C, which remains intact as of 2026, and the traffic-light warning system for the Crawlerway has lights for Pad C.

The plans still set aside room for the remaining two pads, now known as D and E, or in other plans, D and D Alternate. Pad D would have been built further north, the same distance and angle as the separation between B and C, producing a line of four equally-spaced pads. This would put it in the bay to the west of Playalinda Beach, close to the original location of the southernmost pad in the original layout. E, or D Alternate, was due west of C, some distance inland along Patrol Road. The crawler way to both locations split off from the path to C, turning due west for a short distance before bending north to reach D, or northwest to E/D Alternate. Had all of these pads been built, C, D and E would have formed a triangle.

==== Integration of space vehicle stack ====
Months before a launch, the three stages of the Saturn V launch vehicle and the components of the Apollo spacecraft were brought inside the Vehicle Assembly Building (VAB) and assembled, in one of four bays, into a 363-foot (111 m)-tall space vehicle on one of three Mobile Launchers (ML). Each Mobile Launcher consisted of a two-story, 161-by-135-foot (49 by 41 m) launcher platform with four hold-down arms and a 446-foot (136 m) Launch Umbilical Tower (LUT) topped by a crane used to lift the spacecraft elements into position for assembly. The ML and unfueled vehicle together weighed 12,600,000 pounds (5,715 t).

The umbilical tower contained two elevators and nine retractable swing arms that were extended to the space vehicle—to provide access to each of the three rocket stages and the spacecraft for people, wiring, and plumbing—while the vehicle was on the launch pad and were swung away from the vehicle at launch. Technicians, engineers, and astronauts used the uppermost Spacecraft Access Arm to access the crew cabin. At the end of the arm, the white room provided an environmentally controlled and protected area for astronauts and their equipment before entering the spacecraft.

Early diagrams of the proposed layout also included the Nuclear Assembly Building, NAB, northeast of the VAB. These would be used to prepare the nuclear rocket engines being developed under the NERVA program, before moving them to the VAB for assembly into a rocket stack. This program was cancelled and the NAB was not built.

==== Transportation to the pad ====
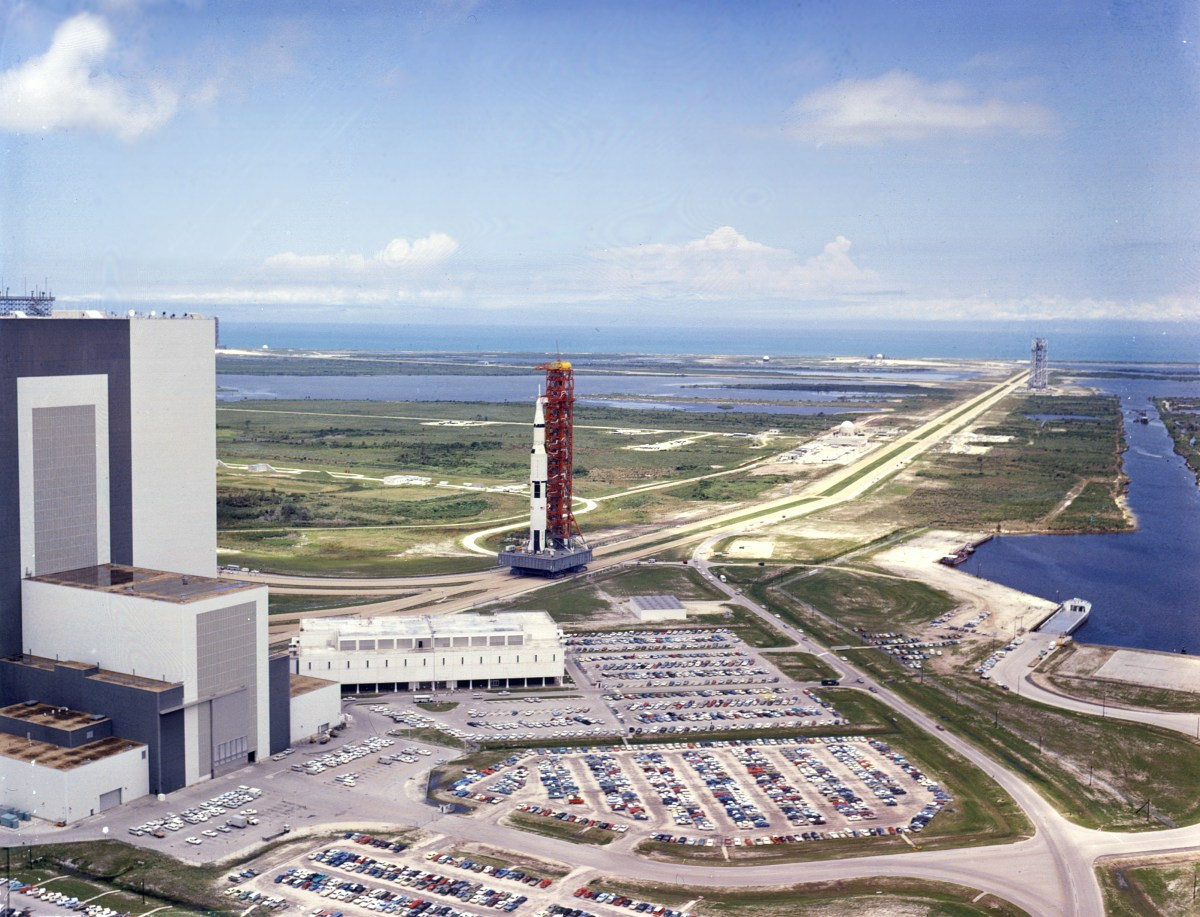
Apollo-Saturn 506 with Apollo 11 spacecraft being moved from the VAB to LC-39A (1969)

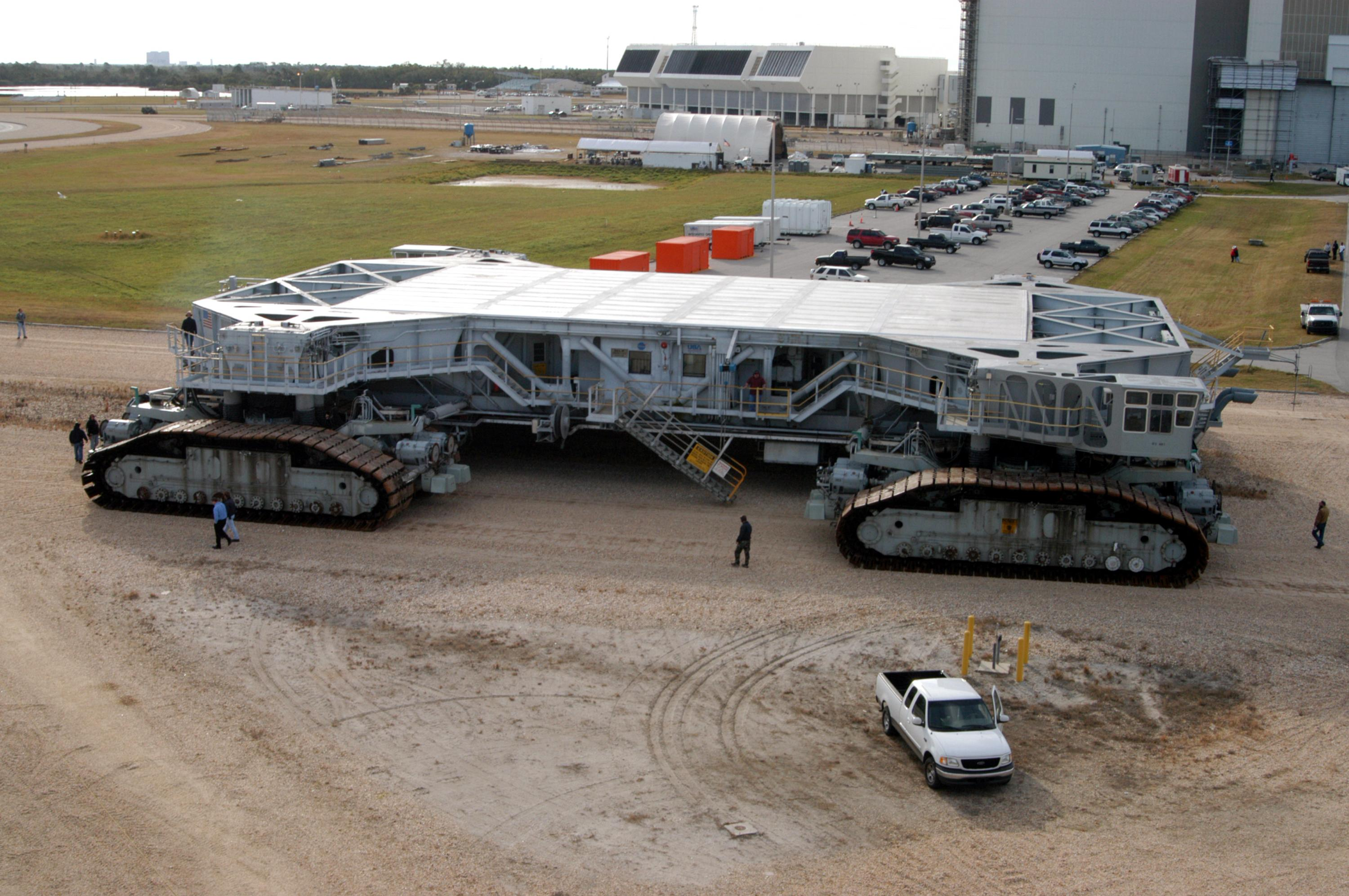
A restored crawler-transporter (2004)

When the stack integration was completed, the Mobile Launcher was moved atop one of two crawler-transporters, or Missile Crawler Transporter Facilities, 3–4 miles (4.8–6.4 km) to its pad at a speed of 1 mile per hour (1.6 km/h). Each crawler weighed 6,000,000 pounds (2,720 t) and was capable of keeping the space vehicle and its launcher platform level while negotiating the 5 percent grade to the pad. At the pad, the ML was placed on six steel pedestals, plus four additional extensible columns.

==== Mobile Service Structure ====
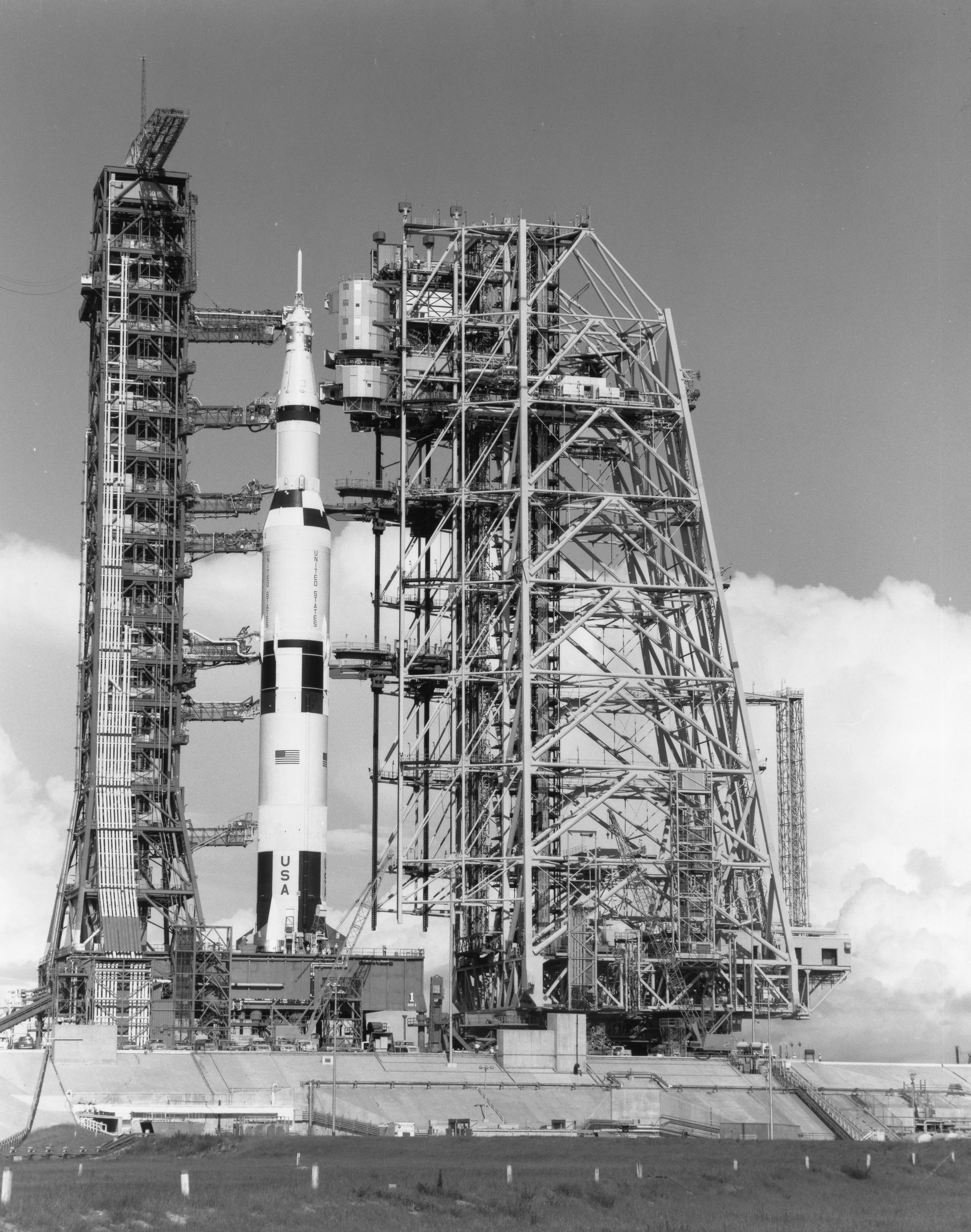
Saturn V with fixed (left) and mobile (right) service structures

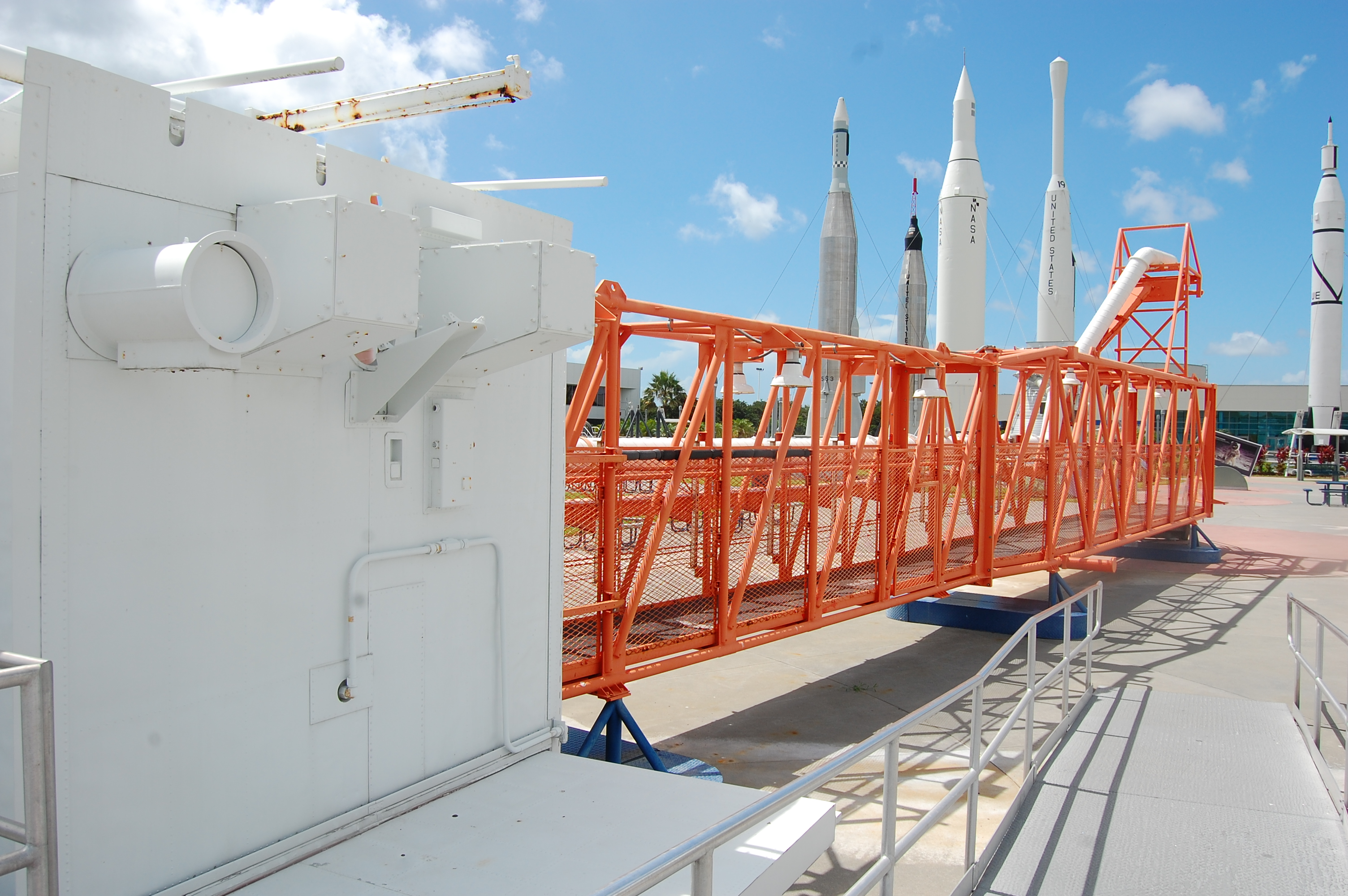
Apollo-era walkway and white room, on display at Kennedy Space Center Visitor Complex

After the ML was set in place, the crawler-transporter rolled a 410-foot (125 m), 10,490,000-pound (4,760 t) Mobile Service Structure (MSS) into place to provide further access for technicians to perform a detailed checkout of the vehicle, and to provide necessary umbilical connections to the pad. The MSS contained three elevators, two self-propelled platforms, and three fixed platforms. It was rolled back 6,900 feet (2,100 m) to a parking position shortly before launch.

==== Flame deflector ====
While the ML was sat on its launch pedestals, one of two flame deflectors was slid on rails into place under it. Having two deflectors allowed for one to be used while the other was being refurbished after a previous launch. Each deflector measured 39 feet (12 m) high by 49 feet (15 m) wide by 75 feet (23 m) long, and weighed 1,400,000 pounds (635 t). During a launch, it deflected the launch vehicle's rocket exhaust flame into a trench measuring 43 feet (13 m) deep by 59 feet (18 m) wide by 449 feet (137 m) long.

==== Launch control and fueling ====
The four-story Launch Control Center (LCC) was located 3.5 miles (5.6 km) away from Pad A, adjacent to the Vehicle Assembly Building, for safety. The third floor had four firing rooms (corresponding to the four bays in the VAB), each with 470 sets of control and monitoring equipment. The second floor contained telemetry, tracking, instrumentation, and data reduction computing equipment. The LCC was connected to the Mobile Launcher Platforms by a high-speed data link; and during launch a system of 62 closed-circuit television cameras transmitted to 100 monitor screens in the LCC.

Large cryogenic tanks located near the pads stored the liquid hydrogen and liquid oxygen (LOX) for the second and third stages of the Saturn V. The highly explosive nature of these chemicals required numerous safety measures at the launch complex. The pads were located 8,730 feet (2,660 m) away from each other. Before tanking operations began and during launch, non-essential personnel were excluded from the danger area.

==== Emergency evacuation system ====
Each pad had a 200-foot (61 m) evacuation tube running from the Mobile Launcher platform to a blast-resistant bunker 39 feet (12 m) underground, nicknamed Rubber room, equipped with survival supplies for 20 persons for 24 hours and reachable through a high-speed elevator.

A further Emergency Egress System was installed to allow fast escape of crew or technicians from pad in case of imminent catastrophic failure of the rocket. The system included seven baskets suspended from seven slidewires that extended from the fixed service structure to a landing zone 370 meters (1,200 ft) to the west. Each basket could hold up to three people, which slid down the wire reaching up to 80 kilometers per hour (50 mph), eventually reaching a gentle stop by means of a braking system catch net and drag chain which slowed and then halted the baskets.

The system was dismantled in 2012, as seen in this video.

==== Pad Terminal Connection Room ====
Connections between the Launch Control Center, Mobile Launcher Platform, and space vehicle were made in the Pad Terminal Connection Room (PTCR), which was a two-story series of rooms located beneath the launch pad on the west side of the flame trench. The "room" was constructed of reinforced concrete and protected by up to 20 feet (6.1 m) of fill dirt.

==== Apollo and Skylab launches ====
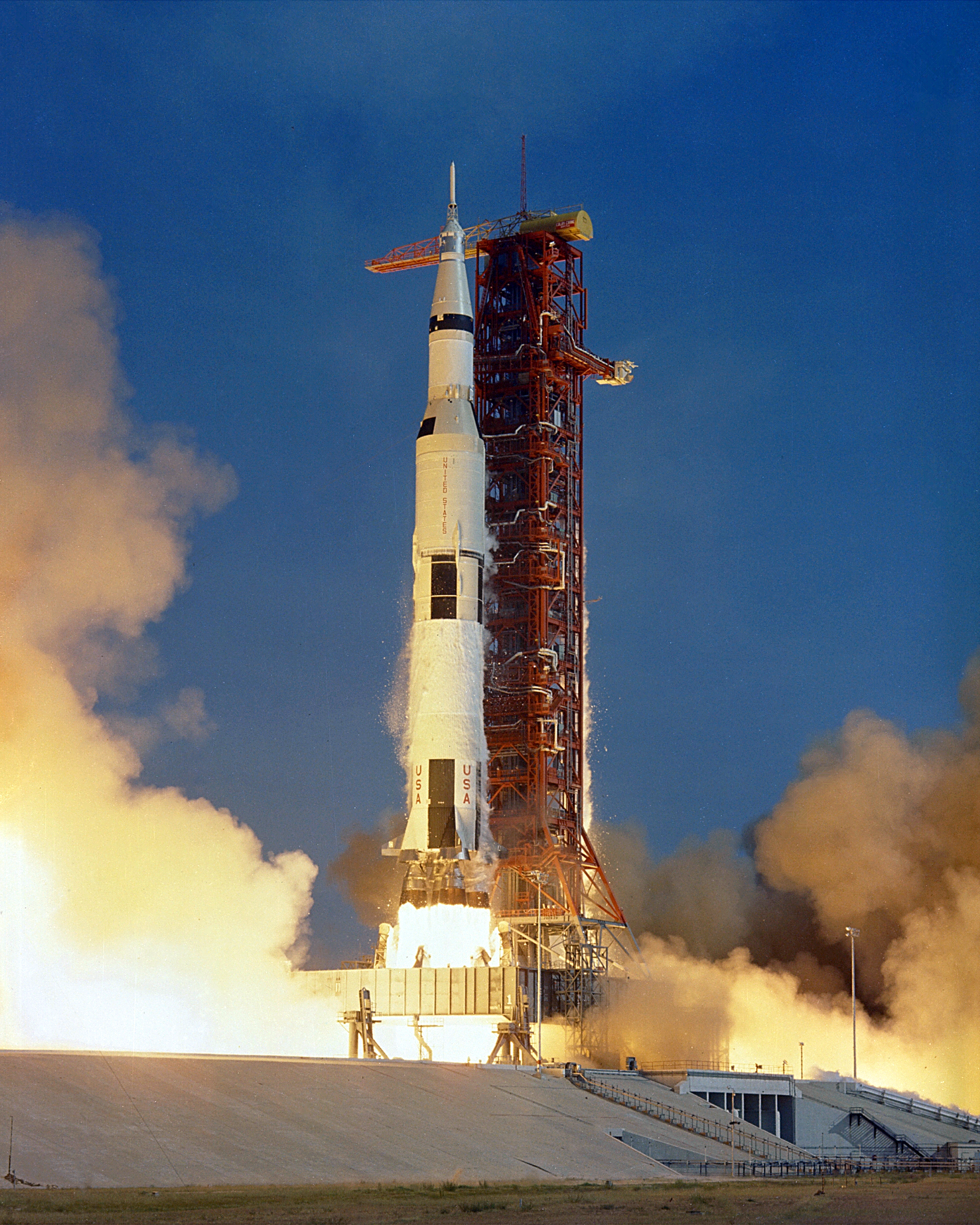
Apollo 11, carrying the first humans to land on the Moon, lifts off from pad 39A, July 16, 1969

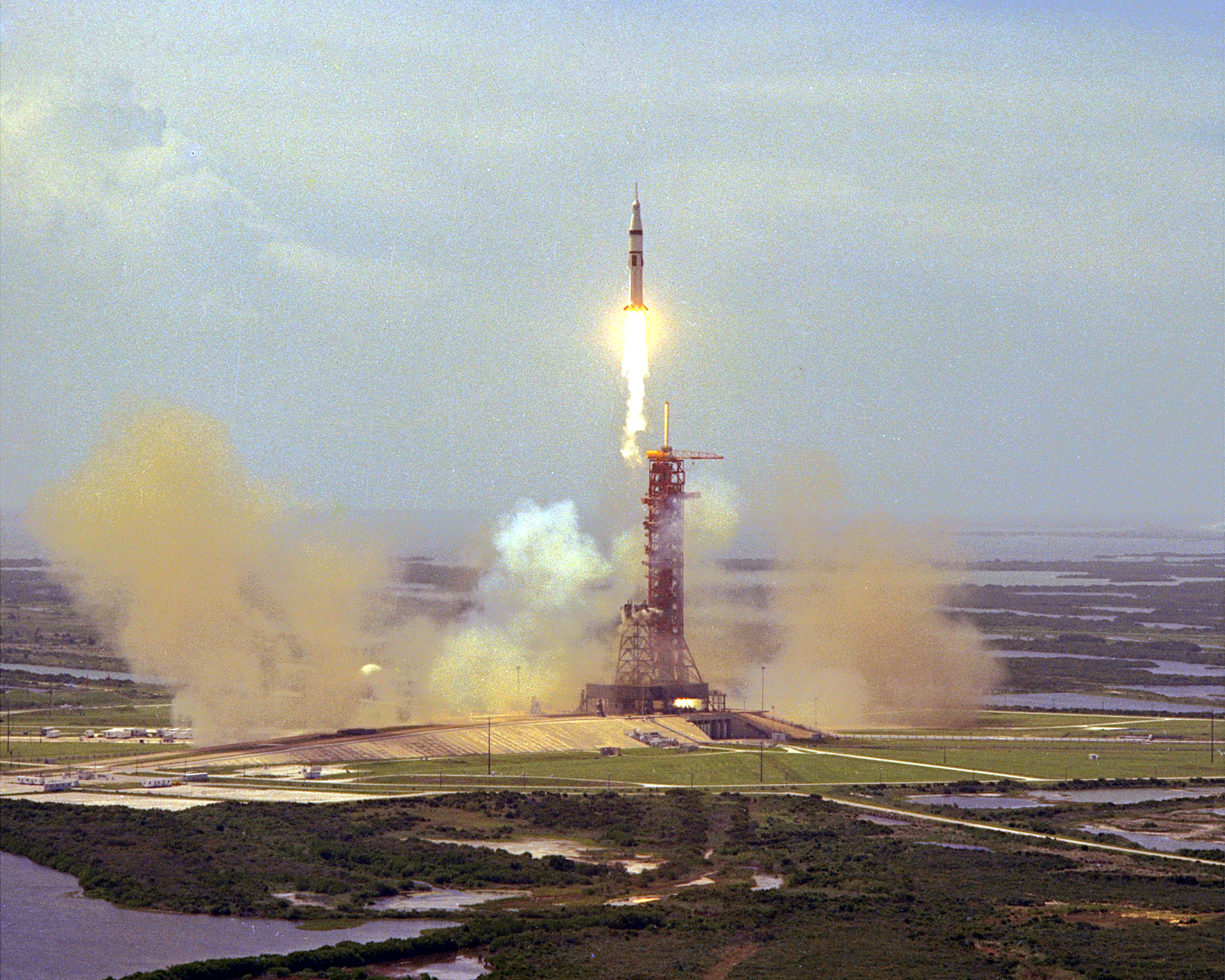
Final launch of a Saturn IB (AS-210) from pad 39B, carrying the Apollo–Soyuz Test Project Command Module into orbit, July 24, 1975

The first launch from Launch Complex 39 came in 1967 with the first Saturn V launch, which carried the uncrewed Apollo 4 spacecraft. The second uncrewed launch, Apollo 6, also used Pad 39A. With the exception of Apollo 10, which used Pad 39B (due to the "all-up" testing resulting in a 2-month turnaround period), all crewed Apollo-Saturn V launches, commencing with Apollo 8, used Pad 39A.

A total of thirteen Saturn Vs were launched for Apollo, including the uncrewed launch of the Skylab space station in 1973. The mobile launchers were then modified for the shorter Saturn IB rockets, by adding a "milk-stool" extension platform to the launch pedestal, so that the S-IVB upper stage and Apollo spacecraft swing arms would reach their targets. These were used for three crewed Skylab flights and the Apollo–Soyuz Test Project, since the Saturn IB pads 34 and 37 at Cape Canaveral SFS had been decommissioned.

=== Space Shuttle ===
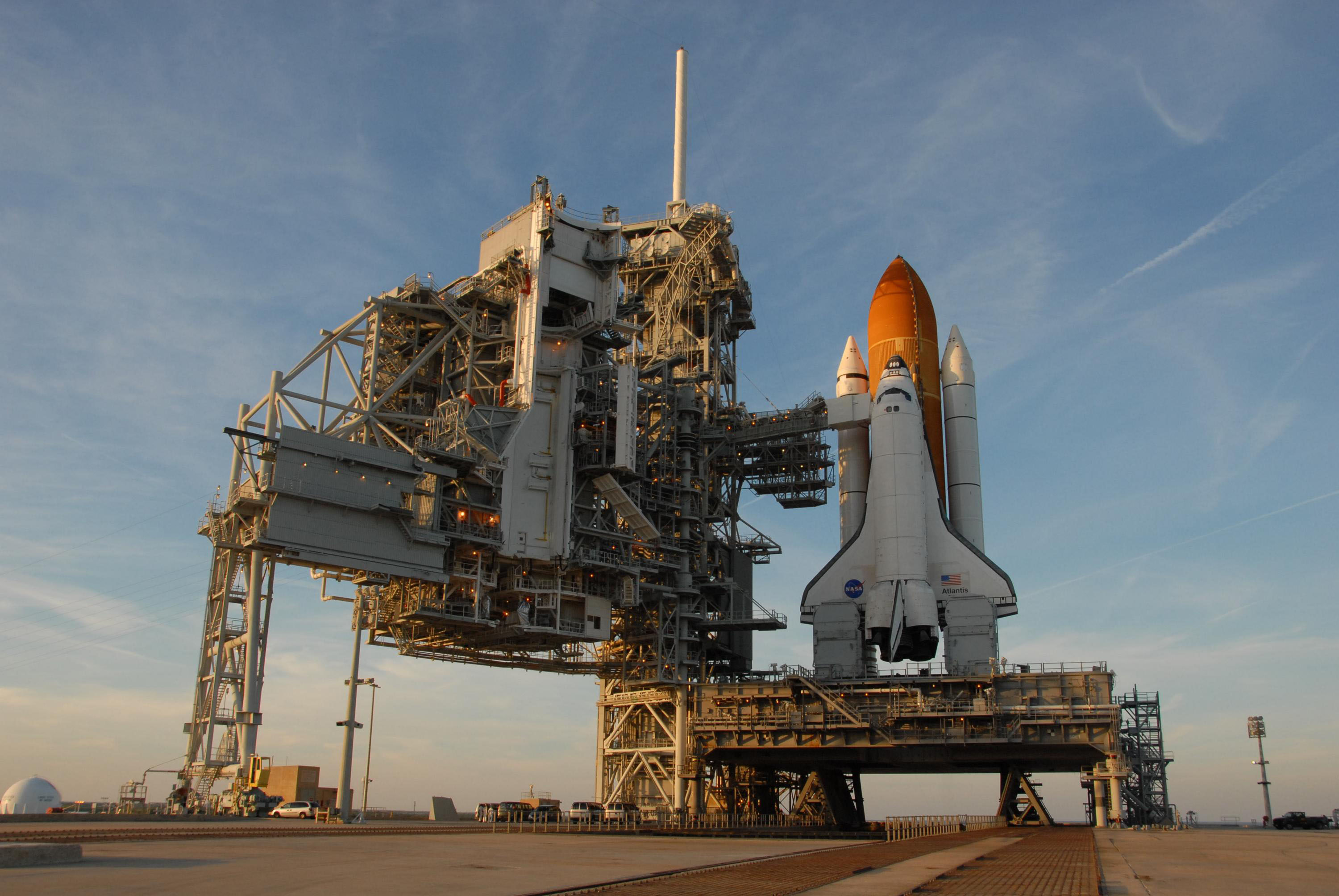
Space Shuttle Atlantis at Launch Complex 39A

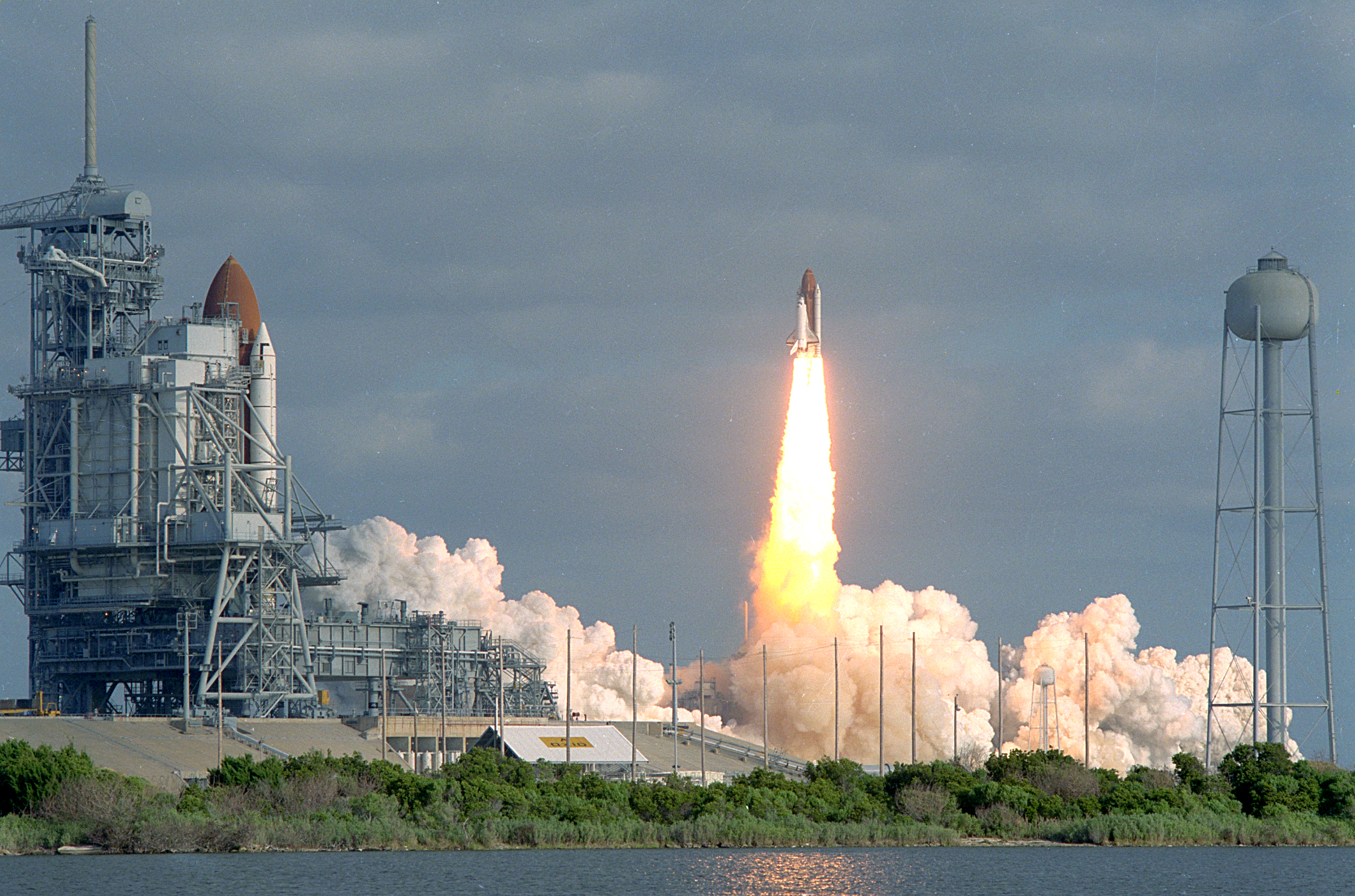
Space Shuttle Discovery launches from LC-39B on STS-31 whilst Space Shuttle Columbia is prepared for STS-35 at LC-39A

The thrust to allow the Space Shuttle to achieve orbit was provided by a combination of the Solid Rocket Boosters (SRBs) and the RS-25 engines. The SRBs used solid propellant, hence their name. The RS-25 engines used a combination of liquid hydrogen and liquid oxygen (LOX) from the external tank (ET), as the orbiter did not have room for internal fuel tanks. The SRBs arrived in segments via rail car from their manufacturing facility in Utah, the external tank arrived from its manufacturing facility in Louisiana by barge, and the orbiter waited in the Orbiter Processing Facility (OPF). The SRBs were first stacked in the VAB, then the External tank was mounted between them, and then, with the help of a massive crane, the orbiter was lowered and connected to the External tank.

The payload to be installed at the launch pad was independently transported in a payload transportation canister and then installed vertically at the Payload Changeout Room. Otherwise, payloads would have already been pre-installed at the Orbiter Processing Facility and transported within the orbiter's cargo bay.

The original structure of the pads was remodeled for the needs of the Space Shuttle, starting with Pad 39A after the last Saturn V launch, and, in 1977, that of Pad 39B after the Apollo–Soyuz in 1975. The first usage of the pad for the Space Shuttle came in 1979, when Enterprise was used to check the facilities prior to the first operational launch.

==== Service structures ====
Each pad contained a two-piece access tower system, the Fixed Service Structure (FSS) and the Rotating Service Structure (RSS). The FSS permitted access to the Shuttle via a retractable arm and a "beanie cap" to capture vented LOX from the external tank.

==== Sound Suppression Water System ====
A Sound Suppression Water System (SSWS) was added to protect the Space Shuttle and its payload from effects of the intense sound wave pressure generated by its engines. An elevated water tank on a 290-foot (88 m) tower near each pad stored 300,000 U.S. gallons (1,100,000 liters) of water, which was released onto the mobile launcher platform just before engine ignition. The water muffled the intense sound waves produced by the engines. Due to heating of the water, a large quantity of steam and water vapor was produced during launch.

==== Swing arm modifications ====
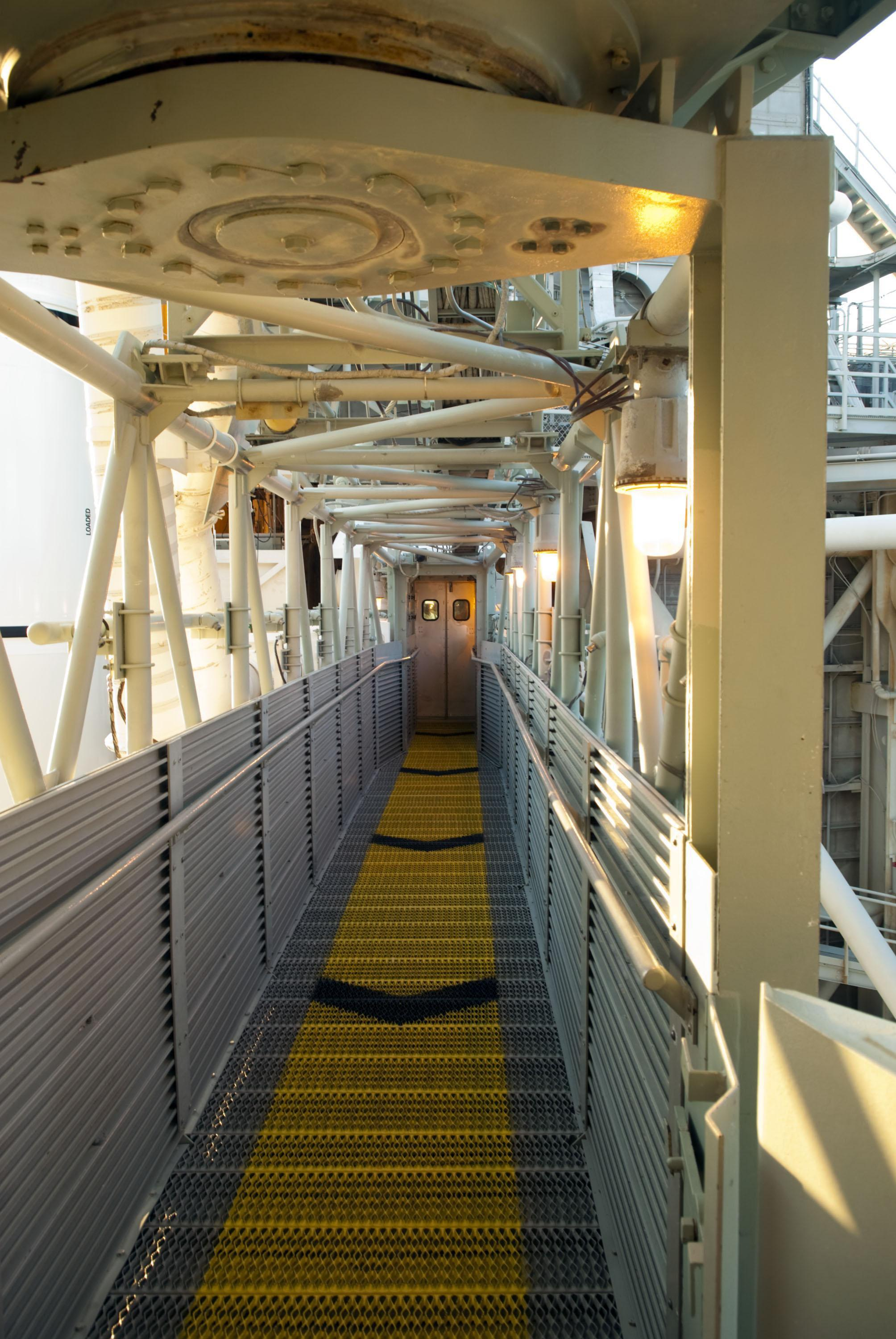
The doors to the White Room, which provided entry to the Shuttle crew compartment, are seen here at the end of the access arm walkway

The Gaseous Oxygen Vent Arm positioned a hood, often called the "Beanie Cap", over the top of the external tank (ET) nose cone during fueling. Heated gaseous nitrogen was used there to remove the extremely cold gaseous oxygen that normally vented out of the external tank. This prevented the formation of ice that could fall and damage the shuttle.

The Hydrogen Vent Line Access Arm mated the External Tank's Ground Umbilical Carrier Plate (GUCP) to the launch pad hydrogen vent line. The GUCP provided support for plumbing and cables, called umbilicals, that transferred fluids, gases, and electrical signals between two pieces of equipment. While the External Tank was being fueled, hazardous gas was vented from an internal hydrogen tank, through the GUCP, and out a vent line to a flare stack where it was burned off at a safe distance. Sensors at the GUCP measured gas level. The GUCP was redesigned after leaks created scrubs of STS-127 and were also detected during attempts to launch STS-119 and STS-133. The GUCP released from the ET at launch and fell away with a curtain of water sprayed across it for protection from flames.

==== Emergency pad evacuation equipment ====
The launch complex was equipped with a slidewire escape basket system for quick evacuation. Assisted by members of the closeout team, the crew would leave the orbiter and ride an emergency basket to the ground at speeds reaching up to 55 miles per hour (89 km/h). From there, the crew took shelter in a bunker.

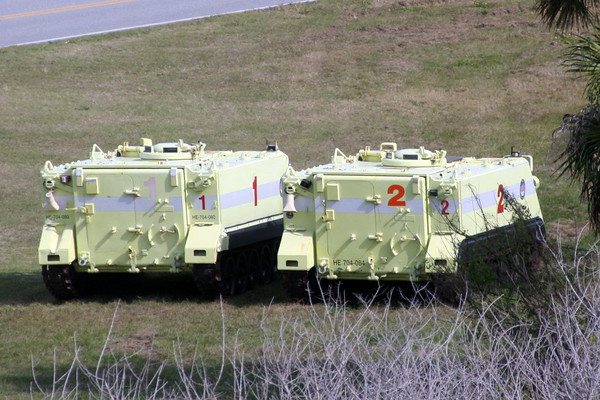
M113 armored personnel carriers parked near LC-39

The pad fire station operated a fleet of four modified M113A2 Firefighting Vehicles, a variant of the M113 APC. Painted in a neon green rescue livery, these vehicles provided viable transportation to rescue personnel and firefighters should they need to approach the pad during a launch emergency. They could also be used to safely evacuate astronauts and crew from the vicinity of the pad. During launches, two manned APCs would be stationed less than a mile from the launch pad (holding firefighters at-the-ready), one unmanned would be stationed on the pad (for extra evacuation capacity), and the fourth provided a backup at the fire station.

During the launch of Discovery on STS-124 on May 31, 2008, the pad at LC-39A suffered extensive damage, in particular to the concrete trench used to deflect the SRB's flames. The subsequent investigation found that the damage was the result of carbonation of epoxy and corrosion of steel anchors that held the refractory bricks in the trench in place. The damage had been exacerbated by the fact that hydrochloric acid is an exhaust by-product of the solid rocket boosters.

==== Space Shuttle launches ====
After the launch of Skylab in 1973, Pad 39A was reconfigured for the Space Shuttle, with shuttle launches beginning with STS-1 in 1981, flown by the Space Shuttle Columbia. After Apollo 10, Pad 39B was kept as a backup launch facility in the case of the destruction of 39A, but saw active service during all three Skylab missions, the Apollo–Soyuz test flight, and a contingency Skylab Rescue flight that never became necessary. After the Apollo–Soyuz Test Project, 39B was reconfigured similarly to 39A; but due to additional modifications (mainly to allow the facility to service a modified Centaur-G upper stage), along with budgetary restraints, it was not ready until 1986. The first shuttle flight to use it was STS-51-L, which ended with the Challenger disaster, after which the first return-to-flight mission, STS-26, was launched from 39B.

Just as for the first 24 shuttle flights, LC-39A supported the final shuttle flights, starting with STS-117 in June 2007 and ending with the retirement of the Shuttle fleet in July 2011. Prior to the SpaceX lease agreement, the pad remained as it was when Atlantis launched on the final shuttle mission on July 8, 2011, complete with a mobile launcher platform.

==== After Space Shuttle retirement ====
With the retirement of the Space Shuttle in 2011, and the cancellation of Constellation Program in 2010, the future of the Launch Complex 39 pads was uncertain. By early 2011, NASA began informal discussions on use of the pads and facilities by private companies to fly missions for the commercial space market, culminating in a 20-year lease agreement with SpaceX for Pad 39A.

Talks for use of the pad were underway between NASA and Space Florida—the State of Florida's economic development agency—as early as 2011, but no deal materialized by 2012, and NASA then pursued other options for removing the pad from the federal government inventory.

=== Constellation program ===
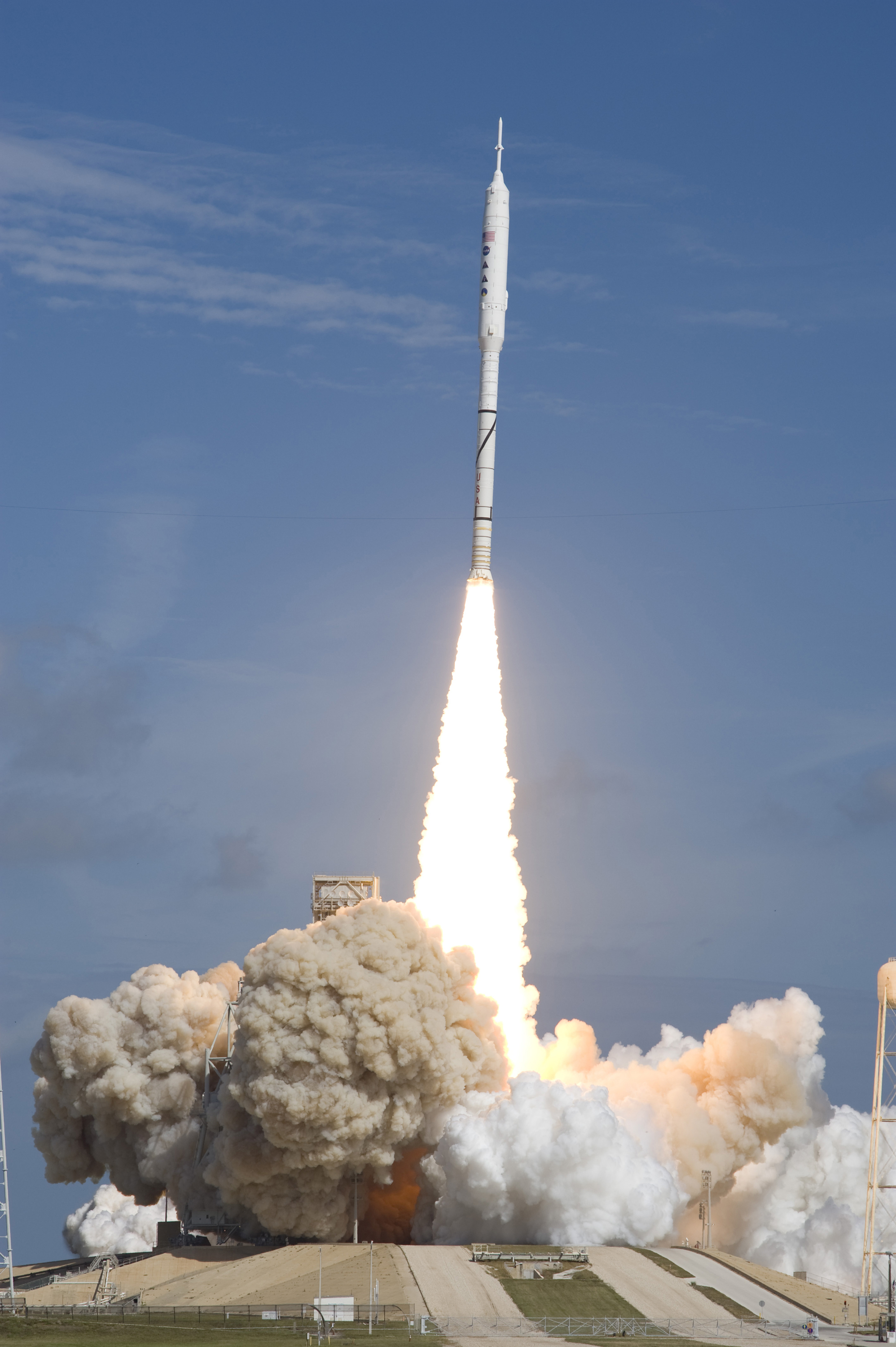
Ares I-X launches from LC-39B, 15:30 UTC, October 28, 2009

The Constellation program planned to use LC-39A for uncrewed Ares V launches and LC-39B for crewed Ares I launches. In preparation for this, NASA began modifying LC-39B to support Ares I launches with 39A planned to be modified in the mid 2010s for Ares V launches. Prior to Ares I-X, the last Shuttle launch from pad 39B was the nighttime launch of STS-116 on December 9, 2006. To support the final Shuttle mission to the Hubble Space Telescope STS-125 launched from pad 39A in May 2009, Endeavour was placed on 39B if needed to launch the STS-400 rescue mission.

After the completion of STS-125, 39B was converted to launch the single test flight of the Constellation Program Ares I-X on October 28, 2009. Pad 39B was then planned to have the FSS and RSS removed in preparation for Ares I. However, in 2010, the Constellation program was cancelled.

=== SpaceX ===
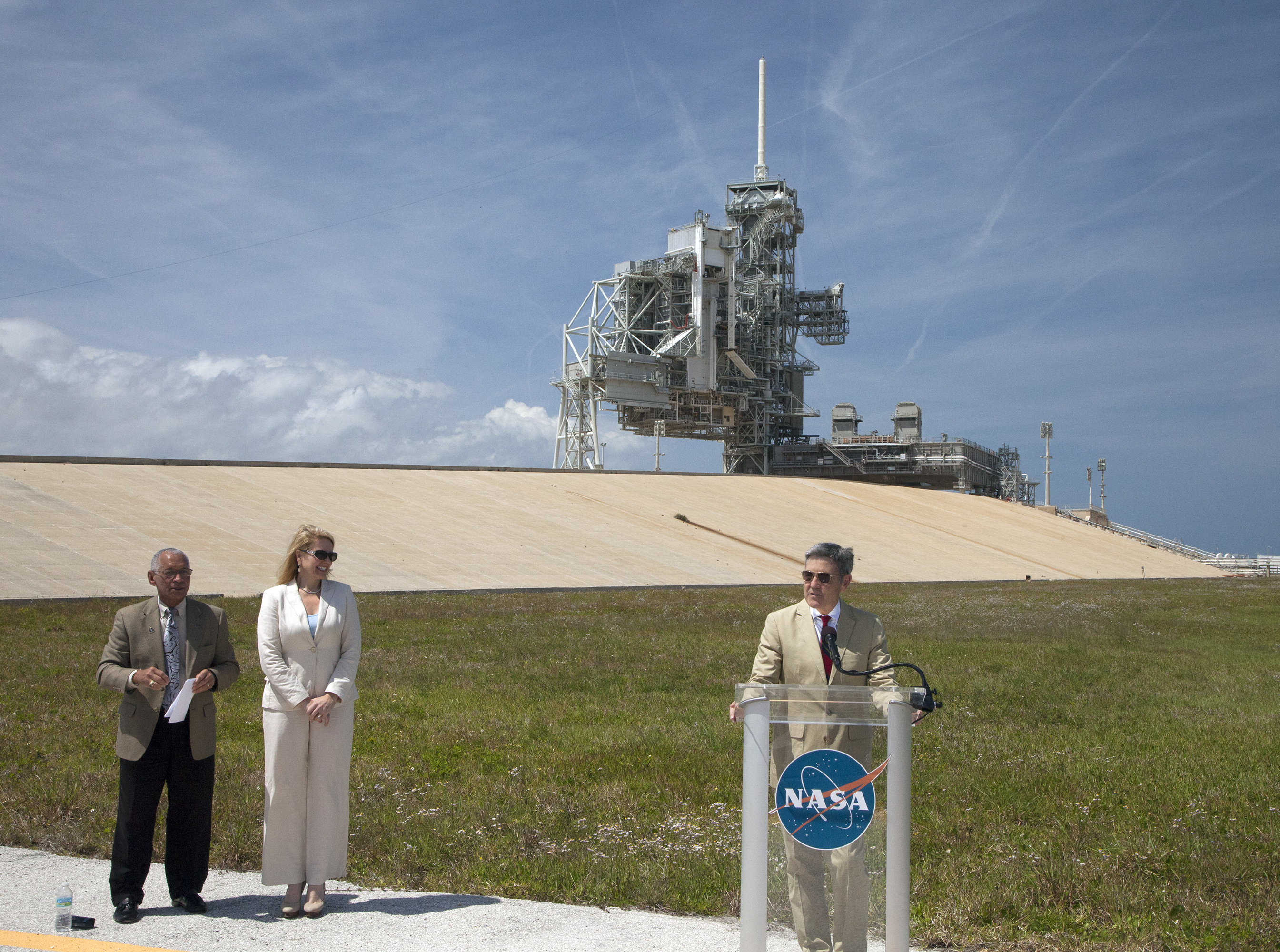
KSC Director Bob Cabana announces the signing of the pad 39A lease agreement on April 14, 2014. SpaceX COO Gwynne Shotwell stands nearby.

By early 2013, NASA publicly announced that it would allow commercial launch providers to lease LC-39A, and followed that, in May 2013, with a formal solicitation for proposals for commercial use of the pad. There were two competing bids for the commercial use of the launch complex. SpaceX submitted a bid for exclusive use of the launch complex, while Jeff Bezos' Blue Origin submitted a bid for shared non-exclusive use of the complex, so that the launchpad would handle multiple vehicles, and costs could be shared over the long-term. One potential shared user in the Blue Origin plan was United Launch Alliance. Prior to the end of the bid period, and prior to any public announcement by NASA of the results of the process, Blue Origin filed a protest with the U.S. General Accounting Office (GAO) "over what it says is a plan by NASA to award an exclusive commercial lease to SpaceX for use of mothballed space shuttle launch pad 39A." NASA had planned to complete the bid award and have the pad transferred by October 1, 2013, but the protest "will delay any decision until the GAO reaches a decision, expected by mid-December." On December 12, 2013, the GAO denied the protest and sided with NASA, which argued that the solicitation contained no preference on the use of the facility as multi-use or single-use. "The [solicitation] document merely asks bidders to explain their reasons for selecting one approach instead of the other and how they would manage the facility."

On April 14, 2014, the privately owned launch service provider SpaceX signed a 20-year lease for Launch Complex 39A (LC-39A). The pad was modified to support launches of both Falcon 9 and Falcon Heavy launch vehicles, modifications that included the construction of a large Horizontal Integration Facility (HIF) similar to that used at existing SpaceX-leased facilities at Cape Canaveral Space Force Station and Vandenberg Air Force Base, horizontal integration being markedly difference from the vertical integration process used to assemble NASA's Apollo and Space Shuttle vehicles at the launch complex. Additionally, new instrumentation and control systems were installed, and substantial new plumbing was added for a variety of rocket liquids and gases.

==== Modifications ====
In 2015, SpaceX built the Horizontal Integration Facility just outside the perimeter of the existing launch pad in order to house both the Falcon 9 and the Falcon Heavy rockets, and their associated hardware and payloads, during preparation for flight. Both types of launch vehicles will be transported from the HIF to the launch pad aboard a Transporter Erector (TE) which will ride on rails up the former crawlerway path. Also in 2015, the launch mount for the Falcon Heavy was constructed on Pad 39A over the existing infrastructure. The work on both the HIF building and the pad was substantially complete by late 2015. A rollout test of the new Transporter Erector was conducted in November 2015.

In February 2016, SpaceX indicated that they had "completed and activated Launch Complex 39A", but still had more work yet to do to support crewed flights. SpaceX originally planned to be ready to accomplish the first launch at pad 39A—of a Falcon Heavy—as early as 2015, as they had had architects and engineers working on the new design and modifications since 2013. By late 2014, a preliminary date for a wet dress rehearsal of the Falcon Heavy was set for no earlier than July 1, 2015. Due to a failure in a June 2015 Falcon 9 launch, SpaceX had to delay launching the Falcon Heavy in order to focus on the Falcon 9's failure investigation and its return to flight. In early 2016, considering the busy Falcon 9 launch manifest, it became unclear if the Falcon Heavy would be the first vehicle to launch from Pad 39A, or if one or more Falcon 9 missions would precede a Falcon Heavy launch. In the following months, the Falcon Heavy launch was delayed multiple times and eventually pushed back to February 2018.

In 2018, SpaceX made further modifications to LC 39A to prepare it to accommodate it for the crew Dragon 2 mission. These modifications included installing a new crew access arm, refurbishing the emergency egress slidewire system, and raising it up to the level of the new arm. The LC 39A fixed service structure was also repainted during this work.

In 2019, SpaceX began substantial modification to LC 39A in order to begin work on phase 1 of the construction to prepare the facility to launch prototypes of the large 9 m (30 ft)-diameter methalox reusable rocket—Starship—from a launch stand, which would fly from 39A on suborbital test flight trajectories with six or fewer Raptor engines. However, these plans were later cancelled.

In 2021, SpaceX began construction of an orbital launch pad for Starship at 39A. As of early 2023, the new launch pad is still undergoing construction and will accommodate launch operations for the fully stacked Starship rocket. Starship will lift off under the power of 33 Raptor engines, with each engine producing 500,000 lbf of force each, or 16,500,000 lbf for the whole vehicle.

Later on, an "Orbital Launch Platform" for Starship with plans to accommodate two landing zones for Falcon 9 and Falcon Heavy rockets to conduct to "Return-to-launch-site" landings.

==== Launch history ====
The first SpaceX launch from pad 39A was SpaceX CRS-10 on February 19, 2017, using a Falcon 9 launch vehicle; it was the company's 10th cargo resupply mission to the International Space Station, and the first uncrewed launch from 39A since Skylab.

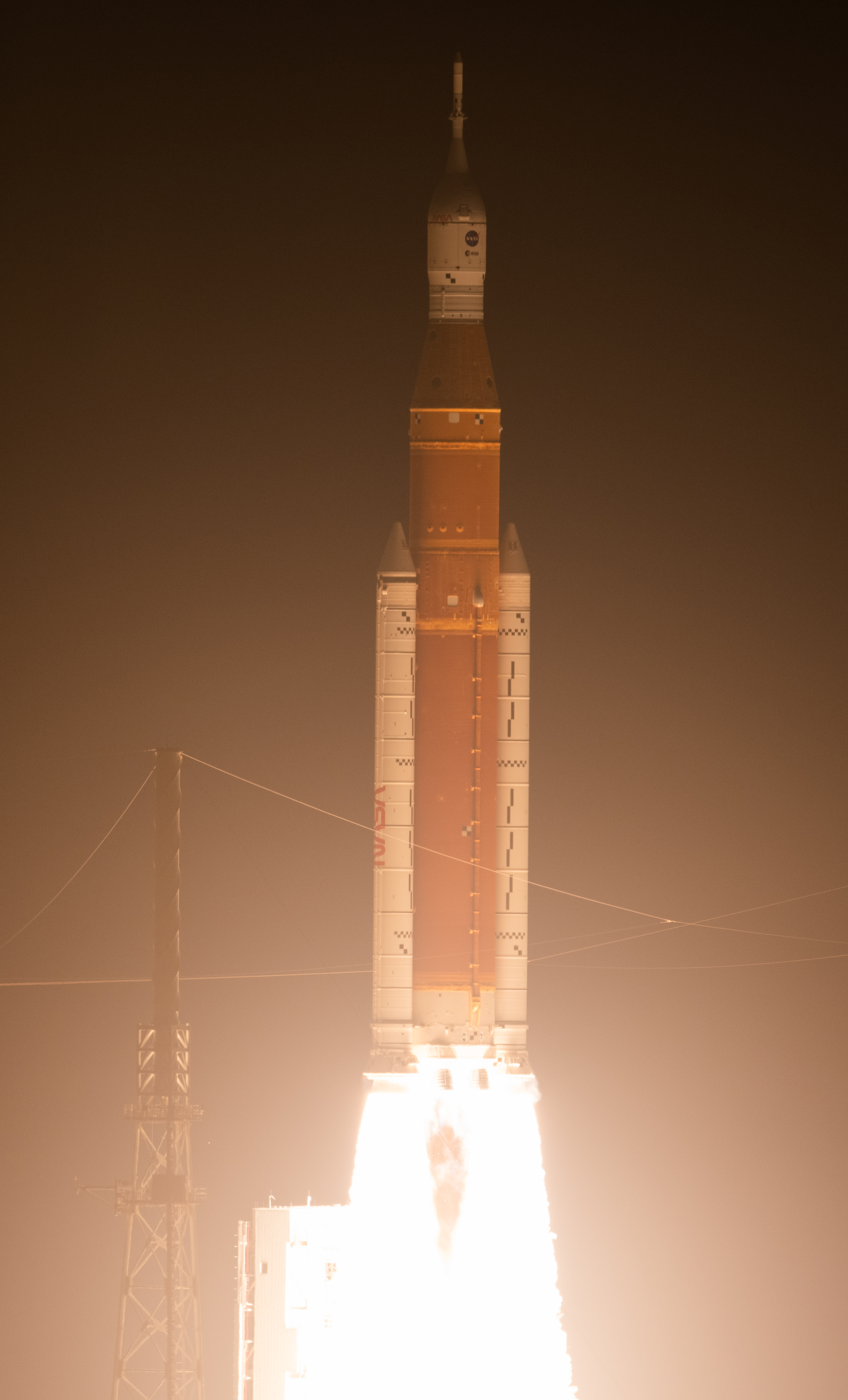
Artemis I, the first launch of the SLS rocket

While Cape Canaveral's Space Launch Complex 40 (SLC-40) was undergoing reconstruction after the loss of the AMOS-6 satellite on September 1, 2016, all SpaceX's east coast launches were from Pad 39A until SLC-40 became operational again in December 2017. These included the May 1, 2017, launch of NROL-76, the first SpaceX mission for the National Reconnaissance Office, with a classified payload.

On February 6, 2018, Pad 39A hosted the successful liftoff of the Falcon Heavy on its maiden launch, carrying Elon Musk's Tesla Roadster car to space; and the first flight of the human-rated spacecraft Crew Dragon (Dragon 2) took place there on March 2, 2019.

The second Falcon Heavy flight, carrying the Arabsat-6A communications satellite for Arabsat of Saudi Arabia, successfully launched on April 11, 2019. The satellite is to provide K_{u} band and K_{a} band communication services for the Middle East and northern Africa, as well as for South Africa. The launch was notable as it marked the first time that SpaceX was able to successfully soft-land all three of the reusable booster stages, which will be refurbished for future launches.

The SpaceX Demo-2 − the first crewed test flight of the Crew Dragon "Endeavour" spacecraft, with astronauts Bob Behnken and Doug Hurley on board launched from Complex 39A on May 30, 2020 and docked to Pressurized Mating Adapter 2 on the Harmony module of the ISS on May 31, 2020.

=== Artemis program ===
On November 16, 2022, at 06:47:44 UTC the Space Launch System (SLS) was launched from Complex 39B as part of the Artemis I mission. On April 1, 2026 at 22:35:12 UTC, the Space Launch System was launched for a second time for the Artemis II mission.

== Current status ==
Facilities and geographic features of Kennedy Space Center
Facilities and geographical features of Kennedy Space Center:
1 Launch Complex 39 (LC-39A)
2 Launch Complex 39 (LC-39B)
3 Vehicle Assembly Building
4 Shuttle Landing Facility
5 Kennedy Space Center Visitor Complex
6 Apollo/Saturn V Center
7 Banana River
8 Indian River
9 KSC Headquarters Building
10 Astronaut Beach House
11 Banana Creek
12 Cochran Cove
13 Operations and Checkout Building
14 Launch Complex 48
15 SpaceX Roberts Road Operations Center
16 Exploration Park
17 Blue Origin Ransom Road facility
18 Crawlerway
19 Launch Control Center
20 Orbiter Processing Facilities 1 and 2
21 Orbiter Processing Facility 3
22 Launch Complex 39 Press Site
23 Multi-Payload Processing Facility
24 Space Systems Processing Facility
25 NASA Railroad (Wilson Junction)

=== Launch Complex 39A ===
SpaceX has launched their launch vehicles from Launch Complex 39A and built a new hangar nearby.

SpaceX assembles its launch vehicles horizontally in a hangar near the pad, and transports them horizontally to the pad before erecting the vehicle to vertical for the launch. For military missions from Pad 39A, payloads will be vertically integrated, as that is required per launch contract with the U.S. Space Force.

Pad 39A is used to host launches of astronauts on the Crew Dragon capsule in a public–private partnership with NASA. In August 2018, SpaceX's Crew Access Arm (CAA) was installed on a new level, which was built at the necessary height to enter the Crew Dragon spacecraft atop a Falcon 9 rocket.

In April 2024, Elon Musk announced that SpaceX would have a launch tower for the Starship completed and operational by mid 2025. Later on, SpaceX presented plans to accommodate two landing zones for Falcon 9 and Falcon Heavy rockets to conduct to "Return-to-launch-site" landings.

=== Launch Complex 39B ===
Since the Artemis I in 2022, Launch Complex 39B is used by NASA's Space Launch System rocket, a Shuttle-derived launch vehicle which is used in the Artemis program and subsequent Moon to Mars campaigns. The pad has also been leased for use by NASA to aerospace company Northrop Grumman, for use as a launch site for their Shuttle-derived OmegA launch vehicle, for National Security Space Launch flights and commercial launches, but the plans were cancelled.

=== Launch Complex 39C ===
Launch Complex 39C is a new facility for small-lift launch vehicles. It was built in 2015 within the Launch Complex 39B perimeter. It was to serve as a multi-purpose site that allowed companies to test the vehicles and capabilities of the smaller class of rockets, making it more affordable for smaller companies to break into the commercial spaceflight market. However, its primary customer Rocket Lab opted to launch their Electron rocket from Wallops Island, instead. Several small-lift launch-vehicle companies also wanted to launch their rockets from a dedicated site at Cape Canaveral instead of 39C.

==== Construction ====
Construction of the pad began in January 2015 and was completed in June 2015. Kennedy Space Center director Robert D. Cabana and representatives from the Ground Systems Development and Operations (GSDO) Program and the Center Planning and Development (CPD) and Engineering directorates marked the completion of the new pad during a ribbon-cutting ceremony on July 17, 2015. "As America's premier spaceport, we're always looking for new and innovative ways to meet America's launch needs, and one area that was missing was small class payloads", Cabana said.

==== Capabilities ====
The concrete pad measures about 50 feet (15 m) wide by about 100 feet (30 m) long and could support the combined weight of a fueled launch vehicle, payload, and customer-provided launch mount up to about 132,000 pounds (60,000 kg), and an umbilical tower structure, fluid lines, cables, and umbilical arms weighing up to about 47,000 pounds (21,000 kg). There is a universal propellant servicing system to provide liquid oxygen and liquid methane fueling capabilities for a variety of small-class rockets.

With the addition of Launch Complex 39C, KSC offered the following processing and launching features for companies working with small-class vehicles (maximum thrust up to 200,000 lbf or 890 kN):

- Processing facilities – i.e. Vehicle Assembly Building
- Vehicle/payload transportation (KAMAG, flatbed trucks, tugs, etc.) from integration facility to pad
- Launch site
- Universal propellant servicing system (LOX, LCH4)
- Launch control center/mobile command center options.

==== Discontinued ====
In 2016 a decision was made not to use LC-39C. Because the site was within the perimeter of LC-39B, Artemis use of that pad would make LC-39C unavailable to users.

== Future development ==
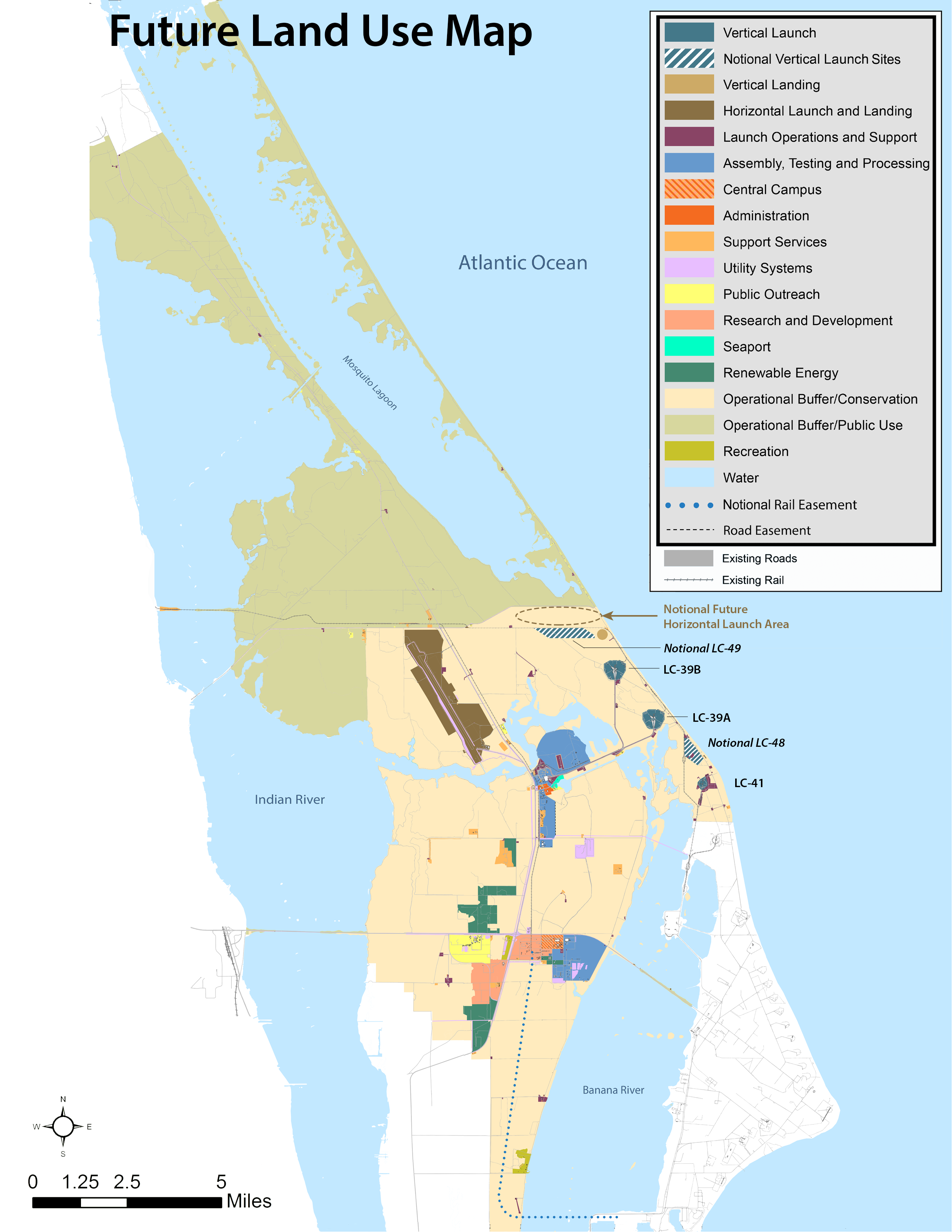
A map shows the current and proposed elements on KSC.

Previous Kennedy Space Center (KSC) Master Plan recommendations—in 1966, 1972, and 1977—noted that an expansion of KSC's vertical launch capacity could occur when the market demand existed. The 2007 Site Evaluation Study recommended an additional vertical launch pad, Launch Complex 49 (LC-49), to be sited north of existing LC-39B.

As part of the Environmental Impact Study (EIS) process, this proposed launch complex was consolidated from two pads (designated in the 1963 plans as 39C and 39D) to one that would provide greater separation from LC-39B. The area was expanded to accommodate a wider variety of launch azimuths, helping to protect against potential overflight concerns of LC-39B. This LC-49 launch facility could accommodate medium to large launch vehicles.

The 2007 Vertical Launch Site Evaluation Study concluded that a vertical launch pad could also be sited to the south of 39A, and to the north of pad 41, to accommodate small to medium launch vehicles. Designated as Launch Complex 48 (LC-48), this area is best suited to accommodate small to medium class launch vehicles, due to its closer proximity to LC-39A and LC-41. Due to the nature of these activities, required quantity-distance arcs, launch hazard impact limit lines, other safety setbacks, and exposure limits will be specified for safe operations. Details of the proposed launch pads were published in the Kennedy Space Center Master Plan in 2012.

The Master Plan also notes a proposed New Vertical Launchpad northwest of LC-39B and a Horizontal Launch Area north of the LC-49 and converting the Shuttle Landing Facility (SLF) and its apron areas into a second Horizontal Launch Area.

Space Florida has proposed that Launch Complex 48 be developed for use by Boeing's Phantom Express and that three landing pads be built for reusable booster systems, to provide more landing options for SpaceX's Falcon 9 and Falcon Heavy, Blue Origin's New Glenn, and other potential reusable vehicles. The pads would be located east of the Horizontal Launch Area and north of LC-39B

In August 2019, SpaceX submitted an Environmental Assessment for Starship launch system at Kennedy Space Center. This document included plans for the construction of additional structures at LC-39A to support Starship launches, including a dedicated pad, liquid methane tanks, and a Landing Zone. These are separate from the existing structures that support Falcon 9 and Falcon Heavy launches.

== Launch statistics ==
=== Main pad ===
- Saturn V
- Space Shuttle
- Falcon 9
- Falcon Heavy

==== Apollo and Apollo Applications ====
All flights operated by NASA.

No.	Date	Time (UTC)	Launch vehicle	Serial number	Mission	Result	Remarks
1	9 November 1967	12:00	Saturn V	SA-501	Apollo 4	Success	Maiden flight of the Saturn V and first launch from LC-39A.
2	4 April 1968	12:00	Saturn V	SA-502	Apollo 6	Partial failure	Pogo oscillations caused a failure of two J-2s in the S-II and a relight of the S-IVB, severely changing the planned mission trajectory of the Apollo CSM.
3	21 December 1968	12:51	Saturn V	SA-503	Apollo 8	Success	First crewed launch of the Saturn V and first crewed launch from LC-39A. First crewed launch going beyond low Earth orbit, inserting into Lunar orbit.
4	3 March 1969	16:00	Saturn V	SA-504	Apollo 9 (CSM Gumdrop and LM Spider)	Success	First launch of the Saturn V in its full Apollo configuration, flying with an Apollo Lunar Module. First American manned flight with a call sign since Gemini 3's Molly Brown in 1965.
5	16 July 1969	13:32	Saturn V	SA-506	Apollo 11 (CSM Columbia and LM Eagle)	Success	First fully operational Apollo flight. First crewed landing on the Moon and on another celestial body.
6	14 November 1969	16:22	Saturn V	SA-507	Apollo 12 (CSM Yankee Clipper and LM Intrepid)	Success	A lightning strike caused the shutdown of the CSM's computer systems, but was successfully restarted mid-flight. First surface rendezvous on another celestial body, landing next to Surveyor 3.
7	11 April 1970	19:13	Saturn V	SA-508	Apollo 13 (CSM Odyssey and LM Aquarius)	Partial failure	First crewed flyby of the Moon and set crewed distance record from Earth that stood until Artemis II in 2026. Launch was a success, but mission had to be aborted following a failure in the CSM's service module during the lunar transfer phase.
8	31 January 1971	21:03	Saturn V	SA-509	Apollo 14 (CSM Kitty Hawk and LM Antares)	Success	
9	26 July 1971	13:34	Saturn V	SA-510	Apollo 15 (CSM Endeavour and LM Falcon)	Success	First flight of the extended Apollo missions, notably carrying the Lunar Roving Vehicle.
10	16 April 1972	17:54	Saturn V	SA-511	Apollo 16 (CSM Casper and LM Orion)	Success	Second flight of the extended Apollo missions.
11	7 December 1972	05:33	Saturn V	SA-512	Apollo 17 (CSM America and LM Challenger)	Success	Last crewed launch of the Saturn V, and last of the extended Apollo missions. Final crewed flight to the Moon until Artemis II in 2026.
12	14 May 1973	17:30	Saturn V	SA-513	Skylab	Success	Last flight of the Saturn V. The S-IVB was replaced with the space station module, while the S-II was modified to make orbit. Payload was extensively damaged during ascent, leading to the loss of the station's micrometeoroid shield and a solar panel.

==== Space Shuttle ====
All flights operated by NASA.

No.	Date	Time (UTC)	Launch vehicle	Shuttle	Mission	Result	Remarks
13	12 April 1981	12:00	Space Shuttle	Columbia	STS-1	Success	Maiden flight of the Space Shuttle program, and maiden flight of Space Shuttle Columbia. First Space Shuttle orbital test. First shuttle landing at Edwards.
14	12 November 1981	15:10	Space Shuttle	Columbia	STS-2	Success	Second orbital test.
15	22 March 1982	16:00	Space Shuttle	Columbia	STS-3	Success	Third orbital test. Only shuttle landing at White Sands.
16	27 June 1982	15:00	Space Shuttle	Columbia	STS-4	Success	Fourth and final Space Shuttle orbital test. First flight for the Department of Defense.
17	11 November 1982	12:19	Space Shuttle	Columbia	STS-5	Success	
18	4 April 1983	18:30	Space Shuttle	Challenger	STS-6	Success	Maiden flight of Space Shuttle Challenger. Launch and deployment of TDRS-1 (as TDRS-A). First launch for the Tracking and Data Relay Satellite System.
19	18 June 1983	11:33	Space Shuttle	Challenger	STS-7	Success	First crewed American flight with a female astronaut, Sally Ride.
20	30 August 1983	06:32	Space Shuttle	Challenger	STS-8	Success	First night launch and night landing of a Shuttle. First crewed flight with an African-American astronaut, Guion Bluford.
21	28 November 1983	16:00	Space Shuttle	Columbia	STS-9	Success	First mission using Spacelab.
22	3 February 1984	13:00	Space Shuttle	Challenger	STS-41-B	Success	First shuttle landing at the Shuttle Landing Facility.
23	6 April 1984	13:58	Space Shuttle	Challenger	STS-41-C	Success	Repair mission for the Solar Maximum Mission satellite launched in 1980. Also deployed the Long Duration Exposure Facility, aiming to study long-term data placed in an outer space environment.
24	30 August 1984	12:41	Space Shuttle	Discovery	STS-41-D	Success	Maiden flight of Space Shuttle Discovery.
25	5 October 1984	11:03	Space Shuttle	Challenger	STS-41-G	Success	Deployment of Earth Radiation Budget Satellite, aiming to study Earth's energy budget.
26	8 November 1984	12:15	Space Shuttle	Discovery	STS-51-A	Success	
27	24 January 1985	19:50	Space Shuttle	Discovery	STS-51-C	Success	DoD mission. Deployment of Magnum satellite, also known as USA-8.
28	12 April 1985	13:59	Space Shuttle	Discovery	STS-51-D	Success	
29	29 April 1985	16:02	Space Shuttle	Challenger	STS-51-B	Success	
30	17 June 1985	11:33	Space Shuttle	Discovery	STS-51-G	Success	
31	29 July 1985	22:00	Space Shuttle	Challenger	STS-51-F	Success	Mission was ultimately a success, but a faulty temperature reading caused an early shutdown of one of the RS-25s, forcing an abort to orbit. Insertion was thus much lower than planned altitude.
32	27 August 1985	10:58	Space Shuttle	Discovery	STS-51-I	Success	
33	3 October 1985	15:15	Space Shuttle	Atlantis	STS-51-J	Success	Maiden flight of Space Shuttle Atlantis. DoD mission. Deployment of two Defense Satellite Communications System satellites, also known as USA-11 and USA-12.
34	30 October 1985	17:00	Space Shuttle	Challenger	STS-61-A	Success	Final successful flight of Space Shuttle Challenger.
35	27 November 1985	00:29	Space Shuttle	Atlantis	STS-61-B	Success	
36	12 January 1986	11:55	Space Shuttle	Columbia	STS-61-C	Success	Last Space Shuttle flight before the Challenger disaster. Carried Representative Bill Nelson onboard.
37	9 January 1990	12:35	Space Shuttle	Columbia	STS-32	Success	First flight from LC-39A following the Space Shuttle's return to flight in 1988. Retrieval of the Long Duration Exposure Facility.
38	28 February 1990	07:50	Space Shuttle	Atlantis	STS-36	Success	DoD mission. Deployment of Misty satellite, also known as USA-53. Shuttle mission with the highest inclination, at 62°. Originally planned to launch from SLC-6 at Vandenberg, prior to the West Coast shuttle program's cancellation post-Challenger.
39	15 November 1990	23:48	Space Shuttle	Atlantis	STS-38	Success	DoD mission. Deployment of SDS satellite, also known as USA-67.
40	28 April 1991	11:33	Space Shuttle	Discovery	STS-39	Success	DoD mission. Performed a variety of experiments.
41	2 August 1991	15:02	Space Shuttle	Atlantis	STS-43	Success	Launch and deployment of TDRS-5 (as TDRS-E) for the Tracking and Data Relay Satellite System.
42	12 September 1991	23:11	Space Shuttle	Discovery	STS-48	Success	Launch and deployment of the Upper Atmosphere Research Satellite.
43	24 November 1991	23:44	Space Shuttle	Atlantis	STS-44	Success	DoD mission. Deployment of Defense Support Program satellite, also known as USA-75.
44	22 January 1992	14:52	Space Shuttle	Discovery	STS-42	Success	
45	24 March 1992	13:13	Space Shuttle	Atlantis	STS-45	Success	
46	25 June 1992	16:12	Space Shuttle	Columbia	STS-50	Success	
47	2 December 1992	13:24	Space Shuttle	Discovery	STS-53	Success	Last flight for the DoD. Deployment of SDS satellite, also known as USA-89.
48	26 April 1993	14:50	Space Shuttle	Columbia	STS-55	Success	
49	3 February 1994	12:10	Space Shuttle	Discovery	STS-60	Success	First shuttle mission to fly with a Russian cosmonaut, Sergei Krikalev.
50	9 April 1994	11:05	Space Shuttle	Endeavour	STS-59	Success	First flight of Space Shuttle Endeavour from 39A.
51	8 July 1994	04:43	Space Shuttle	Columbia	STS-65	Success	
52	30 September 1994	11:16	Space Shuttle	Endeavour	STS-68	Success	
53	2 March 1995	06:38	Space Shuttle	Endeavour	STS-67	Success	
54	27 June 1995	19:32	Space Shuttle	Atlantis	STS-71	Success	First Shuttle docking with the Mir space station.
55	7 September 1995	15:09	Space Shuttle	Endeavour	STS-69	Success	
56	12 November 1995	12:30	Space Shuttle	Atlantis	STS-74	Success	Docking with Mir. Launch and delivery of the Mir Docking Module to the station.
57	16 September 1996	08:54	Space Shuttle	Atlantis	STS-79	Success	Docking with Mir.
58	11 February 1997	08:55	Space Shuttle	Discovery	STS-82	Success	Servicing mission for the Hubble Space Telescope.
59	4 April 1997	19:20	Space Shuttle	Columbia	STS-83	Success	Mission cut short because of a fuel cell issue.
60	15 May 1997	08:07	Space Shuttle	Atlantis	STS-84	Success	Docking with Mir.
61	1 July 1997	18:02	Space Shuttle	Columbia	STS-94	Success	Reflight of STS-83.
62	7 August 1997	14:41	Space Shuttle	Discovery	STS-85	Success	
63	25 September 1997	14:34	Space Shuttle	Atlantis	STS-86	Success	Docking with Mir.
64	23 January 1998	02:48	Space Shuttle	Endeavour	STS-89	Success	Docking with Mir.
65	2 June 1998	22:06	Space Shuttle	Discovery	STS-91	Success	Last shuttle mission to Mir.
66	4 December 1998	08:35	Space Shuttle	Endeavour	STS-88	Success	First flight to the International Space Station and first ISS assembly flight. Added the Unity Node 1 module.
67	11 February 2000	16:43	Space Shuttle	Endeavour	STS-99	Success	
68	19 May 2000	10:11	Space Shuttle	Atlantis	STS-101	Success	Docking with the ISS.
69	11 October 2000	23:17	Space Shuttle	Discovery	STS-92	Success	ISS assembly flight, adding the Z1 truss.
70	7 February 2001	23:13	Space Shuttle	Atlantis	STS-98	Success	ISS assembly flight, adding the Destiny US Lab module.
71	19 April 2001	18:40	Space Shuttle	Endeavour	STS-100	Success	ISS assembly flight, adding the Mobile Servicing System.
72	10 August 2001	21:10	Space Shuttle	Discovery	STS-105	Success	Docking with the ISS.
73	1 March 2002	11:22	Space Shuttle	Columbia	STS-109	Success	Servicing mission for the Hubble Space Telescope. Final successful flight of Space Shuttle Columbia.
74	5 June 2002	21:22	Space Shuttle	Endeavour	STS-111	Success	Docking with the ISS.
75	24 November 2002	00:49	Space Shuttle	Endeavour	STS-113	Success	ISS assembly flight, adding the P1 truss. Last shuttle flight before the Columbia disaster.
76	16 January 2003	15:39	Space Shuttle	Columbia	STS-107	Failure	Launch and orbital operations were a success, but damage to the thermal protection system during ascent resulted in breakup during reentry, causing the Space Shuttle Columbia disaster.
77	8 June 2007	23:38	Space Shuttle	Atlantis	STS-117	Success	ISS assembly flight, adding the S3/S4 truss and solar arrays. First launch from 39A following the shuttle's return to service in 2005.
78	8 August 2007	23:36	Space Shuttle	Endeavour	STS-118	Success	ISS assembly flight, adding the S5 truss.
79	23 October 2007	15:38	Space Shuttle	Discovery	STS-120	Success	ISS assembly flight, adding the Harmony Node 2 module.
80	7 February 2008	19:45	Space Shuttle	Atlantis	STS-122	Success	ISS assembly flight, adding the Columbus European Laboratory module.
81	11 March 2008	06:28	Space Shuttle	Endeavour	STS-123	Success	ISS assembly flight, adding the Experiment Logistics Module-Pressurized Section and Dextre.
82	31 May 2008	21:02	Space Shuttle	Discovery	STS-124	Success	ISS assembly flight, adding the Kibō Japanese Experiment Module.
83	15 November 2008	00:55	Space Shuttle	Endeavour	STS-126	Success	Docking with the ISS.
84	15 March 2009	23:43	Space Shuttle	Discovery	STS-119	Success	ISS assembly flight, adding the S6 solar array and truss.
85	11 May 2009	18:01	Space Shuttle	Atlantis	STS-125	Success	Final servicing mission for the Hubble Space Telescope, and final non-ISS Space Shuttle mission.
86	15 July 2009	22:03	Space Shuttle	Endeavour	STS-127	Success	ISS assembly flight, adding the Japanese Experiment Module Exposed Facility.
87	29 August 2009	03:59	Space Shuttle	Discovery	STS-128	Success	Docking with the ISS. Final shuttle landing at Edwards.
88	16 November 2009	19:28	Space Shuttle	Atlantis	STS-129	Success	Docking with the ISS.
89	8 February 2010	09:14	Space Shuttle	Endeavour	STS-130	Success	ISS assembly flight, adding the Tranquility Node 3 module and Cupola.
90	5 April 2010	10:21	Space Shuttle	Discovery	STS-131	Success	Docking with the ISS. Final night launch of the Space Shuttle.
91	14 May 2010	18:20	Space Shuttle	Atlantis	STS-132	Success	ISS assembly flight, adding the Rassvet Mini-Research module.
92	24 February 2011	21:53	Space Shuttle	Discovery	STS-133	Success	ISS assembly flight, adding the Leonardo Permanent Multipurpose Module. Final daytime shuttle landing, and final flight of Space Shuttle Discovery.
93	16 May 2011	12:56	Space Shuttle	Endeavour	STS-134	Success	ISS assembly flight, adding the Alpha Magnetic Spectrometer. Final flight of Space Shuttle Endeavour.
94	8 July 2011	15:29	Space Shuttle	Atlantis	STS-135	Success	Docking with the ISS. Final flight of Space Shuttle Atlantis, final crewed launch from the United States until 2020, and the final flight of the Space Shuttle program.

==== Falcon 9 and Falcon Heavy ====
All flights operated by SpaceX.

===== Falcon 9 and Falcon Heavy (2017-2025) =====
No.	Date	Time (UTC)	Launch Vehicle	Booster flight (Note: Falcon 9 first-stage boosters have a four-digit serial number. A hyphen followed by a number indicates the flight count. For example, B1021‑1 and B1021‑2 represent the first and second flights of booster B1021. Boosters without a hyphen were expended on their first flight.)	Payload/mission	Result	Remarks
95	19 February 2017	14:39	Falcon 9 Full Thrust	1031‑1	SpaceX CRS-10	Success	ISS resupply flight. First Falcon 9 launch from LC-39A, and first unmanned launch from 39A since Skylab in 1973. Originally planned to launch from SLC-40, but the AMOS-6 preclusion rendered that pad out of use until repairs.
96	16 March 2017	06:00	Falcon 9 Full Thrust	1030	EchoStar 23	Success	First uncrewed launch not to the ISS from LC-39A since Apollo 6 in 1968. First stage expended.
97	30 March 2017	22:27	Falcon 9 Full Thrust	1021‑2	SES-10	Success	First ever reflight of a previously used Falcon 9 first stage, being previously flown in 2016 as part of SpaceX CRS-8.
98	1 May 2017	11:15	Falcon 9 Full Thrust	1032‑1	NROL-76	Success	NRO launch. Unknown satellite, also known as USA-276. First classified Falcon 9 flight and first SpaceX flight for the National Reconnaissance Office.
99	15 May 2017	23:21	Falcon 9 Full Thrust	1034‑1	Inmarsat-5 F4	Success	First stage expended.
100	3 June 2017	21:07	Falcon 9 Full Thrust	1035‑1	SpaceX CRS-11	Success	ISS resupply flight. Launched and delivered ROSA and NICER. First flight of a reused Dragon capsule, previously flown as part of SpaceX CRS-4.
101	23 June 2017	19:10	Falcon 9 Full Thrust	1029‑2	BulgariaSat-1	Success	
102	5 July 2017	23:38	Falcon 9 Full Thrust	1037	Intelsat 35e	Success	First stage expended.
103	14 August 2017	16:31	Falcon 9 Block 4	1039‑1	SpaceX CRS-12	Success	ISS resupply flight. First Block 4 launch.
104	7 September 2017	14:00	Falcon 9 Block 4	1040‑1	X-37B OTV-5	Success	Fifth flight of the Boeing X-37B. First X-37B flight not launched on an Atlas V.
105	11 October 2017	22:53	Falcon 9 Full Thrust	1031‑2	SES-11 / EchoStar 105	Success	
106	30 October 2017	19:34	Falcon 9 Block 4	1042‑1	Koreasat 5A	Success	
107	6 February 2018	20:45	Falcon Heavy	1033 (core); 1023‑2, 1025‑2 (sides)	Falcon Heavy test flight	Success	Maiden launch of Falcon Heavy and first of two National Security Space Launch certification launches. Placed Elon Musk's Tesla Roadster into heliocentric orbit. Boosters successfully recovered, but core stage was lost. First flight from LC-39A since SLC-40 was reactivated.
108	11 May 2018	20:14	Falcon 9 Block 5	1046‑1	Bangabandhu-1	Success	First Block 5 launch.
109	15 November 2018	20:46	Falcon 9 Block 5	1047‑2	Es'hail 2	Success	
110	2 March 2019	07:19	Falcon 9 Block 5	1051‑1	Crew Dragon Demo-1 (Dragon C204)	Success	Maiden flight of Crew Dragon and first SpaceX demonstration flight for the Commercial Crew Program, docking with the ISS. Only flight of Dragon C204 before it was accidentally destroyed during a test.
111	11 April 2019	22:35	Falcon Heavy	1055 (core); 1052‑1, 1053‑1 (sides)	Arabsat-6A	Success	First Block 5 Falcon Heavy launch and second of two National Security Space Launch certification launches. All three cores safely landed, but the core stage tipped over during transport back to Port Canaveral.
112	25 June 2019	06:30	Falcon Heavy	1057 (core); 1052‑2, 1053‑2 (sides)	STP-2	Success	First DoD flight for Falcon Heavy, and successful recovery of a fairing.
113	19 January 2020	15:30	Falcon 9 Block 5	1046‑4	Crew Dragon in-flight abort test (Dragon C205)	Success	Suborbital flight. Falcon 9 was deliberately destroyed 85 seconds in to simulate a failure at max q. Dragon capsule then separated and followed an abort procedure. Only flight of Crew Dragon C205.
114	18 March 2020	12:16	Falcon 9 Block 5	1048‑5	Starlink 5 (v1.0)	Success	First Starlink launch from LC-39A.
115	22 April 2020	19:30	Falcon 9 Block 5	1051‑4	Starlink 6 (v1.0)	Success	
116	30 May 2020	19:22	Falcon 9 Block 5	1058‑1	Crew Dragon Demo-2 (Dragon Endeavour)	Success	Maiden crewed flight of a Falcon 9 and the first crewed flight from the United States since STS-135 in 2011, carrying astronauts Bob Behnken and Doug Hurley to the ISS. Maiden flight of Crew Dragon Endeavour.
117	7 August 2020	05:12	Falcon 9 Block 5	1051‑5	Starlink 9 (v1.0)	Success	
118	3 September 2020	12:46	Falcon 9 Block 5	1060‑2	Starlink 11 (v1.0)	Success	
119	6 October 2020	11:29	Falcon 9 Block 5	1058‑3	Starlink 12 (v1.0)	Success	
120	18 October 2020	12:25	Falcon 9 Block 5	1051‑6	Starlink 13 (v1.0)	Success	
121	16 November 2020	00:27	Falcon 9 Block 5	1061‑1	SpaceX Crew-1 (Dragon Resilience)	Success	First crew rotation mission of the Commercial Crew Program to the ISS and maiden flight of Crew Dragon Resilience.
122	6 December 2020	16:17	Falcon 9 Block 5	1058‑4	SpaceX CRS-21	Success	ISS resupply flight. Launched and delivered the Nanoracks Bishop Airlock. Maiden flight of Cargo Dragon 2.
123	19 December 2020	14:00	Falcon 9 Block 5	1059‑5	NROL-108	Success	NRO launch. Two reported Starshield satellites, also known as USA-312 and USA-313.
124	20 January 2021	13:02	Falcon 9 Block 5	1051‑8	Starlink 16 (v1.0)	Success	
125	4 March 2021	08:24	Falcon 9 Block 5	1049‑8	Starlink 17 (v1.0)	Success	
126	14 March 2021	10:01	Falcon 9 Block 5	1051‑9	Starlink 21 (v1.0)	Success	
127	23 April 2021	09:49	Falcon 9 Block 5	1061‑2	SpaceX Crew-2 (Dragon Endeavour)	Success	ISS crew rotation flight.
128	4 May 2021	19:01	Falcon 9 Block 5	1049‑9	Starlink 25 (v1.0)	Success	
129	15 May 2021	22:56	Falcon 9 Block 5	1058‑8	Starlink 25 (v1.0)	Success	
130	3 June 2021	17:29	Falcon 9 Block 5	1067‑1	SpaceX CRS-22	Success	ISS resupply flight. Launched and delivered the first set of iROSA solar panels.
131	29 August 2021	07:14	Falcon 9 Block 5	1061‑4	SpaceX CRS-23	Success	ISS resupply flight.
132	16 September 2021	00:02	Falcon 9 Block 5	1062‑3	Inspiration4 (Dragon Resilience)	Success	First private crewed orbital spaceflight, being commanded by entrepreneur Jared Isaacman. First non-ISS American crewed spaceflight since STS-125 in 2009, first splashdown in the Atlantic Ocean since Apollo 9 in 1969, and set highest crewed altitude record since STS-103 in 1999.
133	11 November 2021	02:03	Falcon 9 Block 5	1067‑2	SpaceX Crew-3 (Dragon Endurance)	Success	ISS crew rotation flight. Maiden flight of Crew Dragon Endurance.
134	9 December 2021	06:00	Falcon 9 Block 5	1061‑5	Imaging X-ray Polarimetry Explorer	Success	Part of the Explorers Program. Launch consisted of three identical telescope tasked with x-ray astronomy.
135	21 December 2021	10:06	Falcon 9 Block 5	1069‑1	SpaceX CRS-24	Success	ISS resupply flight.
136	6 January 2022	21:49	Falcon 9 Block 5	1062‑4	Starlink Group 4–5	Success	
137	19 January 2022	02:02	Falcon 9 Block 5	1060‑10	Starlink Group 4–6	Success	
138	3 February 2022	18:13	Falcon 9 Block 5	1061‑6	Starlink Group 4–7	Success	
139	3 March 2022	14:25	Falcon 9 Block 5	1060‑11	Starlink Group 4–9	Success	
140	8 April 2022	15:17	Falcon 9 Block 5	1062‑5	Axiom Mission 1 (Dragon Endeavour)	Success	Docking with the ISS. First private crewed flight to the ISS.
141	27 April 2022	07:52	Falcon 9 Block 5	1067‑4	SpaceX Crew-4 (Dragon Freedom)	Success	ISS crew rotation flight. Maiden flight of Crew Dragon Freedom.
142	6 May 2022	09:46	Falcon 9 Block 5	1058‑12	Starlink Group 4–17	Success	
143	18 May 2022	10:59	Falcon 9 Block 5	1052‑5	Starlink Group 4–18	Success	
144	17 June 2022	16:09	Falcon 9 Block 5	1060‑13	Starlink Group 4–19	Success	
145	15 July 2022	00:44	Falcon 9 Block 5	1067‑5	SpaceX CRS-25	Success	ISS resupply flight.
146	24 July 2022	13:38	Falcon 9 Block 5	1062‑8	Starlink Group 4–25	Success	
147	10 August 2022	02:14	Falcon 9 Block 5	1073‑3	Starlink Group 4–26	Success	
148	11 September 2022	01:20	Falcon 9 Block 5	1058‑14	Starlink Group 4–20	Success	
149	5 October 2022	16:00	Falcon 9 Block 5	1077‑1	SpaceX Crew-5 (Dragon Endurance)	Success	ISS crew rotation flight.
150	1 November 2022	13:41	Falcon Heavy	1066 (core); 1064‑1, 1065‑1 (sides)	USSF-44	Success	Launch for the United States Space Force. Eight technology demonstration satellites, also known as USA-339, 340, 341, 344, 399, 546, 547, and 548. Core stage expended.
151	26 November 2022	19:20	Falcon 9 Block 5	1076‑1	SpaceX CRS-26	Success	ISS resupply flight. Launched and delivered the second set of iROSA solar panels.
152	8 December 2022	22:27	Falcon 9 Block 5	1069‑4	OneWeb Flight #15	Success	
153	17 December 2022	21:32	Falcon 9 Block 5	1058‑15	Starlink Group 4–37	Success	
154	15 January 2023	22:56	Falcon Heavy	1070 (core); 1064‑2, 1065‑2 (sides)	USSF-67	Success	Launch for the United States Space Force. CBAS satellite, also known as USA-342. Core stage expended.
155	2 February 2023	07:58	Falcon 9 Block 5	1069‑5	Starlink Group 5–3	Success	
156	2 March 2023	05:34	Falcon 9 Block 5	1078‑1	SpaceX Crew-6 (Dragon Endeavour)	Success	ISS crew rotation flight.
157	15 March 2023	00:30	Falcon 9 Block 5	1073‑7	SpaceX CRS-27	Success	ISS resupply flight.
158	1 May 2023	00:26	Falcon Heavy	1068 (core); 1052‑8, 1053‑3 (sides)	ViaSat-3 Americas	Success	Heaviest all-electric satellite launched into orbit. All three boosters expended.
159	21 May 2023	21:37	Falcon 9 Block 5	1080‑1	Axiom Mission 2 (Dragon Freedom)	Success	Private crewed docking to the ISS.
160	5 June 2023	15:47	Falcon 9 Block 5	1077‑5	SpaceX CRS-28	Success	ISS resupply flight. Launched and delivered the third set of iROSA solar panels.
161	29 July 2023	03:04	Falcon Heavy	1074 (core); 1064‑3, 1065‑3 (sides)	EchoStar-24	Success	Heaviest geostationary satellite ever launched. Core stage expended.
162	26 August 2023	07:27	Falcon 9 Block 5	1081‑1	SpaceX Crew-7 (Dragon Endurance)	Success	ISS crew rotation flight.
163	4 September 2023	02:47	Falcon 9 Block 5	1073‑10	Starlink Group 6–12	Success	
164	13 October 2023	14:19	Falcon Heavy	1079 (core); 1064‑4, 1065‑4 (sides)	Psyche	Success	Part of the Discovery Program, aimed at studying 16 Psyche. First Falcon Heavy launch towards another celestial body. Core stage expended.
165	10 November 2023	01:28	Falcon 9 Block 5	1081‑2	SpaceX CRS-29	Success	ISS resupply flight.
166	29 December 2023	01:07	Falcon Heavy	1084 (core); 1064‑5, 1065‑5 (sides)	X-37B OTV-7	Success	Seventh flight of the X-37B. First X-37B flight to medium Earth orbit, and first flight on a Falcon Heavy. Core stage expended.
167	18 January 2024	21:49	Falcon 9 Block 5	1080‑5	Axiom Mission 3 (Dragon Freedom)	Success	Private crewed docking to the ISS.
168	29 January 2024	01:10	Falcon 9 Block 5	1062‑18	Starlink Group 6–38	Success	
169	15 February 2024	06:05	Falcon 9 Block 5	1060‑18	IM-1	Success	Part of the Commercial Lunar Payload Services program. First launch of Intuitive Machines' Nova-C Lunar lander. Second mission and first successful flight of the program. First launch to the Moon from 39A since Apollo 17 in 1972.
170	4 March 2024	03:53	Falcon 9 Block 5	1083‑1	SpaceX Crew-8 (Dragon Endeavour)	Success	ISS crew rotation flight.
171	16 March 2024	00:21	Falcon 9 Block 5	1062‑19	Starlink Group 6–44	Success	
172	24 March 2024	03:09	Falcon 9 Block 5	1060‑19	Starlink Group 6–42	Success	
173	30 March 2024	21:52	Falcon 9 Block 5	1076‑12	Eutelsat 36D	Success	
174	7 April 2024	23:16	Falcon 9 Block 5	1073‑14	Bandwagon-1	Success	First SpaceX dedicated rideshare mission from LC-39A.
175	17 April 2024	21:26	Falcon 9 Block 5	1077‑12	Starlink Group 6–51	Success	
176	28 April 2024	00:34	Falcon 9 Block 5	1060‑20	Galileo-L12	Success	Part of the Galileo satellite navigation system. First Gallileo launch from the United States, following development issues with Ariane 6. First stage expended.
177	8 May 2024	18:42	Falcon 9 Block 5	1083‑3	Starlink Group 6–56	Success	
178	24 May 2024	02:45	Falcon 9 Block 5	1077‑13	Starlink Group 6–63	Success	
179	25 June 2024	21:26	Falcon Heavy	1087 (core); 1072‑1, 1086‑1 (sides)	GOES-19	Success	Part of the Geostationary Operational Environmental Satellite system of satellites. Launched as GOES-U. First GOES launch on a SpaceX rocket. Core stage expended.
180	27 July 2024	05:45	Falcon 9 Block 5	1069‑17	Starlink Group 10–9	Success	
181	2 August 2024	05:01	Falcon 9 Block 5	1078‑12	Starlink Group 10–6	Success	
182	12 August 2024	10:37	Falcon 9 Block 5	1073‑17	Starlink Group 10–7	Success	
183	10 September 2024	09:23	Falcon 9 Block 5	1083‑4	Polaris Dawn (Dragon Resilience)	Success	First mission of the private Polaris Program, commanded by Jared Isaacman. First ever private spacewalk, conducted by Isaacman and Sarah Gillis. Set non-Lunar crewed altitude record, surpassing Gemini 11 in 1966, and contributed to current record of most people in orbit, at 19.
184	14 October 2024	16:06	Falcon Heavy	1089 (core); 1064‑6, 1065‑6 (sides)	Europa Clipper	Success	Part of the Large Strategic Science Missions, aimed at studying Jupiter and its moon Europa through performing successive close-proximity flybys. First Falcon Heavy launch to another planet. All three boosters expended.
185	5 November 2024	02:29	Falcon 9 Block 5	1083‑5	SpaceX CRS-31	Success	ISS resupply flight.
186	11 November 2024	17:22	Falcon 9 Block 5	1067‑23	Koreasat 6A	Success	
187	17 November 2024	22:28	Falcon 9 Block 5	1077‑16	Optus-X/TD7	Success	
188	27 November 2024	04:41	Falcon 9 Block 5	1078‑15	Starlink Group 6–76	Success	
189	5 December 2024	16:10	Falcon 9 Block 5	1076‑19	SXM-9	Success	
190	17 December 2024	22:26	Falcon 9 Block 5	1090‑1	O3b mPOWER 7 & 8	Success	
191	23 December 2024	05:35	Falcon 9 Block 5	1080‑14	Starlink Group 12–2	Success	
192	31 December 2024	05:39	Falcon 9 Block 5	1078‑16	Starlink Group 12–6	Success	
193	8 January 2025	15:27	Falcon 9 Block 5	1086‑3	Starlink Group 12–11	Success	
194	15 January 2025	06:11	Falcon 9 Block 5	1085‑5	Blue Ghost Mission 1 /Hakuto-R Mission 2	Success	Part of the Commercial Lunar Payload Services program for Blue Ghost, private mission for Hakuto-R. First launch of Firefly Aerospace's Blue Ghost and second launch of ispace's Hakuto-R Lunar landers. Blue Ghost became first completely successful CLPS mission. Hakuto-R crashed into lunar surface during final descent.
195	21 January 2025	05:24	Falcon 9 Block 5	1083‑8	Starlink Group 13–1	Success	
196	30 January 2025	01:34	Falcon 9 Block 5	1073‑21	Spainsat NG I	Success	First stage expended.
197	4 February 2025	23:13	Falcon 9 Block 5	1086‑4	WorldView Legion 5 & 6	Success	
198	27 February 2025	00:16	Falcon 9 Block 5	1083‑9	IM-2	Success	Part of the Commercial Lunar Payload Services program. Second flight of Nova-C. Flight contained secondary payloads Lunar Trailblazer, Brokkr-2, and Chimera-1.
199	14 March 2025	23:03	Falcon 9 Block 5	1069‑22	SpaceX Crew-10 (Dragon Endurance)	Success	ISS crew rotation flight.
200	1 April 2025	01:46	Falcon 9 Block 5	1085‑6	Fram2 (Dragon Resilience)	Success	Private crewed mission, commanded by Chun Wang. First ever crewed mission to go into polar orbit, and first polar launch from LC-39A.
201	13 April 2025	00:53	Falcon 9 Block 5	1083‑10	Starlink Group 12–17	Success	
202	21 April 2025	08:15	Falcon 9 Block 5	1092‑3	SpaceX CRS-32	Success	ISS resupply flight.
203	29 April 2025	02:34	Falcon 9 Block 5	1094‑1	Starlink Group 12–10	Success	
204	4 May 2025	08:54	Falcon 9 Block 5	1078‑20	Starlink Group 6–84	Success	
205	13 May 2025	05:02	Falcon 9 Block 5	1067‑28	Starlink Group 6–83	Success	
206	28 May 2025	13:30	Falcon 9 Block 5	1080‑19	Starlink Group 10–32	Success	
207	25 June 2025	06:31	Falcon 9 Block 5	1094‑2	Axiom Mission 4 (Dragon Grace)	Success	Private crewed docking to the ISS. Maiden flight of Crew Dragon Grace.
208	1 July 2025	21:04	Falcon 9 Block 5	1085‑9	MTG-S1/Sentinel-4A	Success	Part of ESA's Copernicus Programme series of earth observation satellites. First Sentinel launch from Florida.
209	1 August 2025	15:43	Falcon 9 Block 5	1094‑3	SpaceX Crew-11 (Dragon Endeavour)	Success	ISS crew rotation flight. Final Falcon 9 landing at LZ-1.
210	22 August 2025	03:50	Falcon 9 Block 5	1092‑6	X-37B OTV-8	Success	Eighth flight of the Boeing X-37B, also known as USSF-36. Third launch from Falcon.
211	28 August 2025	08:12	Falcon 9 Block 5	1067‑30	Starlink Group 10–11	Success	First time a booster reached 30 flights.
212	5 September 2025	12:32	Falcon 9 Block 5	1069‑27	Starlink Group 10-57	Success	
213	24 September 2025	11:30	Falcon 9 Block 5	1096‑2	Interstellar Mapping and Acceleration Probe	Success	Part of the Solar Terrestrial Probes program, designed to observe particle acceleration and solar wind interaction with the interstellar medium. Launched alongside SWFO-L1 and the Carruthers Geocorona Observatory.
214	9 November 2025	08:10	Falcon 9 Block 5	1069‑28	Starlink Group 10‑51	Success	
215	15 November 2025	03:08	Falcon 9 Block 5	1092‑8	Starlink Group 6‑89	Success	
216	21 November 2025	03:39	Falcon 9 Block 5	1080‑23	Starlink Group 6‑78	Success	
217	1 December 2025	07:44	Falcon 9 Block 5	1095‑4	Starlink Group 6‑86	Success	
218	8 December 2025	22:26	Falcon 9 Block 5	1067‑32	Starlink Group 6‑92	Success	
219	17 December 2025	13:42	Falcon 9 Block 5	1094‑6	Starlink Group 6‑99	Success	Final Falcon 9 flight at LC-39A before pad was prioritized towards Falcon Heavy and Starship launches.

===== Falcon 9 and Falcon Heavy (since 2026) =====
No.	Date	Time (UTC)	Launch Vehicle	Booster flight	Payload/mission	Result	Remarks
220	29 April 2026	14:13	Falcon Heavy	1098 (core); 1072‑2, 1075‑22 (sides)	ViaSat-3 F3	Success	Core stage expended.
221	30 August 2026	11:26	Falcon Heavy	1105 (core); 1072‑3, 1104‑1 (sides)	Nancy Grace Roman Space Telescope	Success	Part of the Large Strategic Science Missions, a space telescope designed to conduct infrared astronomy with a wide field of view, complimenting the Hubble Space Telescope and James Webb Space Telescope. Notably uses a mirror donated by the NRO to NASA in 2012. Core stage expended.
222	2 October 2026	03:54	Falcon Heavy	1106 (core); 1072‑4, 1104‑2 (sides)	NROL-97	Success	NRO launch. Unknown satellite, also known as USA-708. First Falcon Heavy launch for the National Reconnaissance Office. LZ-1 was temporarily reactivated for use thanks to LZ-40 already being occupied by SpaceX Crew-13's booster. Core stage expended.

==== Upcoming launches ====
Date	Launch vehicle	Payload
January 2027	Falcon Heavy	Griffin Mission One

=== Starship pad ===
==== Upcoming launches ====
Date	Launch vehicle	Payload
Q4 2026	Starship	Starlink Group 30-1

=== LC-39B ===
- Saturn V
- Saturn IB
- Space Shuttle
- Ares I
- SLS

=== Apollo and Apollo Applications ===
All flights operated by NASA.

No.	Date	Time (UTC)	Launch vehicle	Serial number	Mission	Result	Remarks
1	18 May 1969	16:49	Saturn V	SA-505	Apollo 10 (CSM Charlie Brown and LM Snoopy)	Success	First launch, first crewed launch, and only Saturn V launch from LC-39B. Launch was conducted at the pad to practice high Saturn V launch cadence.
2	25 May 1973	13:00	Saturn IB	SA-206	Skylab 2	Success	First visit to Skylab, making emergency repairs sustained during space station's launch. First launch of the Saturn IB from LC-39B, and the first launch of the Saturn IB since Apollo 7 in 1968.
3	28 July 1973	11:10	Saturn IB	SA-207	Skylab 3	Success	Second visit to Skylab.
4	16 November 1973	14:01	Saturn IB	SA-208	Skylab 4	Success	Last visit to Skylab. Set American record for time in space that stayed until the advent of ISS expeditions.
5	15 July 1975	19:50	Saturn IB	SA-210	Apollo–Soyuz	Success	The Apollo component of the Apollo–Soyuz Test Project, complementing Soyuz 19. First crewed international spaceflight for NASA, and last flight of the Saturn IB, Saturn family, and Apollo CSM.

=== Space Shuttle ===
All flights operated by NASA.

No.	Date	Time (UTC)	Launch vehicle	Shuttle	Mission	Result	Remarks
6	28 January 1986	16:38	Space Shuttle	Challenger	STS-51-L	Failure	First Space Shuttle launch from LC-39B. Intended to launch and deploy TDRS-B for the Tracking and Data Relay Satellite System. A failure of the solid rocket booster led to breakup 73 seconds after launch, causing the Space Shuttle Challenger disaster.
7	28 September 1988	15:37	Space Shuttle	Discovery	STS-26	Success	First Space Shuttle launch following the Challenger disaster. Launch and deployment of TDRS-3 (as TDRS-C) for the Tracking and Data Relay Satellite System.
8	2 December 1988	14:30	Space Shuttle	Atlantis	STS-27	Success	Classified Department of Defense mission. Deployment of Lacrosse satellite, also known as USA-34. Shuttle's thermal protection system was extensively damaged during liftoff, but survived reentry.
9	13 March 1989	14:37	Space Shuttle	Discovery	STS-29	Success	Launch and deployment of TDRS-4 (as TDRS-D) for the Tracking and Data Relay Satellite System.
10	4 May 1989	14:46	Space Shuttle	Atlantis	STS-30	Success	Launch and deployment of Magellan, aiming to study and create a radar map of Venus.
11	8 August 1989	12:37	Space Shuttle	Columbia	STS-28	Success	DoD mission. Deployment of SDS satellite and SSF satellite, also known as USA-40 and USA-41 respectively.
12	18 October 1989	16:53	Space Shuttle	Atlantis	STS-34	Success	Launch and deployment Galileo. Part of the Large Strategic Science Missions, designed to study Jupiter and its moons. First spacecraft to enter orbit of Jupiter and of an outer planet, and first spacecraft to enter the atmosphere of a gas giant with atmospheric probe. First Shuttle launch with an RTG.
13	23 November 1989	00:23	Space Shuttle	Discovery	STS-33	Success	DoD mission. Deployment of Magnum satellite, also known as USA-48.
14	12 April 1990	12:33	Space Shuttle	Discovery	STS-31	Success	Launch and deployment of the Hubble Space Telescope. Part of the Large Strategic Science Missions, a space telescope designed to conduct optical astronomy. Collaboration between NASA and ESA. Was serviced five times over the following 20 years.
15	6 October 1990	11:47	Space Shuttle	Discovery	STS-41	Success	Launch and deployment of Ulysses. Collaboration between NASA and ESA, designed to study the Sun from various inclinations. First spacecraft to enter polar heliocentric orbit, thanks to a gravity assist from Jupiter.
16	2 December 1990	06:49	Space Shuttle	Columbia	STS-35	Success	
17	5 April 1991	14:22	Space Shuttle	Atlantis	STS-37	Success	Launch and deployment of the Compton Gamma Ray Observatory. Part of the Large Strategic Science Missions, a space telescope designed to conduct gamma-ray astronomy.
18	5 June 1991	13:24	Space Shuttle	Columbia	STS-40	Success	
19	7 May 1992	23:40	Space Shuttle	Endeavour	STS-49	Success	Maiden flight of Space Shuttle Endeavour. Servicing mission for Intelsat 603, following staging failure during launch on a Commercial Titan III in 1990. Only spacewalk so far to feature three astronauts.
20	31 July 1992	13:56	Space Shuttle	Atlantis	STS-46	Success	
21	12 September 1992	14:23	Space Shuttle	Endeavour	STS-47	Success	
22	22 October 1992	17:09	Space Shuttle	Columbia	STS-52	Success	
23	13 January 1993	13:59	Space Shuttle	Endeavour	STS-54	Success	Launch and deployment of TDRS-6 (as TDRS-F) for the Tracking and Data Relay Satellite System.
24	8 April 1993	05:29	Space Shuttle	Discovery	STS-56	Success	
25	21 June 1993	13:07	Space Shuttle	Endeavour	STS-57	Success	
26	12 September 1993	11:45	Space Shuttle	Discovery	STS-51	Success	
27	18 October 1993	14:53	Space Shuttle	Columbia	STS-58	Success	
28	2 December 1993	09:27	Space Shuttle	Endeavour	STS-61	Success	Servicing mission for the Hubble Space Telescope. Notable for correcting its optics caused by incorrect mirror grounding made before launch.
29	4 March 1994	13:53	Space Shuttle	Columbia	STS-62	Success	
30	9 September 1994	22:22	Space Shuttle	Discovery	STS-64	Success	
31	3 November 1994	16:59	Space Shuttle	Atlantis	STS-66	Success	
32	3 February 1995	05:22	Space Shuttle	Discovery	STS-63	Success	First shuttle mission to the space station Mir. Rendezvoused, but did not dock.
33	13 July 1995	13:41	Space Shuttle	Discovery	STS-70	Success	Launch and deployment of TDRS-7 (as TDRS-G). Last Shuttle launch for the Tracking and Data Relay Satellite System.
34	20 October 1995	13:53	Space Shuttle	Columbia	STS-73	Success	
35	11 January 1996	09:41	Space Shuttle	Endeavour	STS-72	Success	Retrieval mission for NASDA's Space Flyer Unit, launched on an H-II from Tanegashima ten months before.
36	22 February 1996	20:18	Space Shuttle	Columbia	STS-75	Success	
37	22 March 1996	08:13	Space Shuttle	Atlantis	STS-76	Success	Docking with Mir.
38	19 May 1996	10:30	Space Shuttle	Endeavour	STS-77	Success	
39	20 June 1996	14:49	Space Shuttle	Columbia	STS-78	Success	
40	19 November 1996	19:55	Space Shuttle	Columbia	STS-80	Success	Longest ever Space Shuttle flight, at 17 days and 15 hours.
41	12 January 1997	09:27	Space Shuttle	Atlantis	STS-81	Success	Docking with Mir.
42	19 November 1997	19:46	Space Shuttle	Columbia	STS-87	Success	
43	17 April 1998	18:19	Space Shuttle	Columbia	STS-90	Success	Final Spacelab flight.
44	29 October 1998	19:19	Space Shuttle	Discovery	STS-95	Success	Carried senator and Mercury-Atlas 6 veteran John Glenn into orbit.
45	27 May 1999	10:49	Space Shuttle	Discovery	STS-96	Success	First non-assembly Space Shuttle flight to the International Space Station.
46	23 July 1999	04:31	Space Shuttle	Columbia	STS-93	Success	Launch and deployment of the Chandra X-Ray Observatory. Part of the Large Strategic Science Missions, a space telescope designed to conduct x-ray astronomy.
47	19 December 1999	00:50	Space Shuttle	Discovery	STS-103	Success	Servicing mission for the Hubble Space Telescope.
48	8 September 2000	12:45	Space Shuttle	Atlantis	STS-106	Success	Docking with the ISS.
49	1 December 2000	03:06	Space Shuttle	Endeavour	STS-97	Success	ISS assembly flight, adding the P6 solar array and radiators.
50	8 March 2001	11:42	Space Shuttle	Discovery	STS-102	Success	Docking with the ISS.
51	12 July 2001	09:03	Space Shuttle	Atlantis	STS-104	Success	ISS assembly flight, adding the Quest Joint Airlock.
52	5 December 2001	22:19	Space Shuttle	Endeavour	STS-108	Success	Docking with the ISS.
53	8 April 2002	20:44	Space Shuttle	Atlantis	STS-110	Success	ISS assembly flight, adding the S0 truss.
54	7 October 2002	19:45	Space Shuttle	Atlantis	STS-112	Success	ISS assembly flight, adding the S1 truss.
55	26 July 2005	14:39	Space Shuttle	Discovery	STS-114	Success	Docking with the ISS. First Space Shuttle flight following the Columbia disaster in 2003.
56	4 July 2006	18:37	Space Shuttle	Discovery	STS-121	Success	Docking with the ISS.
57	9 September 2006	15:14	Space Shuttle	Atlantis	STS-115	Success	ISS assembly flight, adding the P3/P4 truss and solar arrays.
58	10 December 2006	00:47	Space Shuttle	Discovery	STS-116	Success	ISS assembly flight, adding the P5 truss. Final Space Shuttle flight from LC-39B.

=== Constellation and Artemis ===
All flights operated by NASA.

No.	Date	Time (UTC)	Launch vehicle	Configuration	Spacecraft	Mission	Result	Remarks
59	28 October 2009	15:30	Ares I	Ares I-X	Boilerplate	Ares I-X	Success	Suborbital launch. Carried a boilerplate upper stage and Orion spacecraft. Only launch of the Ares I and of the Constellation Program before their cancellations in 2010. First uncrewed launch from LC-39B.
60	16 November 2022	06:47	Space Launch System	SLS Block 1	Orion CM-002	Artemis I	Success	Maiden flight of SLS and first launch of the Artemis Program. Inaugural flight of a complete Orion spacecraft. First flight of a crewable spacecraft to the Moon since Apollo 17 in 1972, and first 39B launch beyond low Earth orbit since Apollo 10 in 1969.
61	1 April 2026	22:35	Space Launch System	SLS Block 1	Orion CM-003 Integrity	Artemis II	Success	First crewed flight of SLS, the Orion spacecraft, and the Artemis Program. First crewed flight to the Moon since Apollo 17 in 1972, and first crewed launch from LC-39B since STS-116 in 2006. Set crewed distance record from Earth, surpassing Apollo 13 in 1970. Carried Victor Glover, Christina Koch, and Jeremy Hansen, respectively the first person of color, woman, and non-American to travel beyond LEO.

=== Upcoming launches ===
Date	Launch vehicle	Mission
June 2027	Space Launch System	Artemis III

== Gallery ==
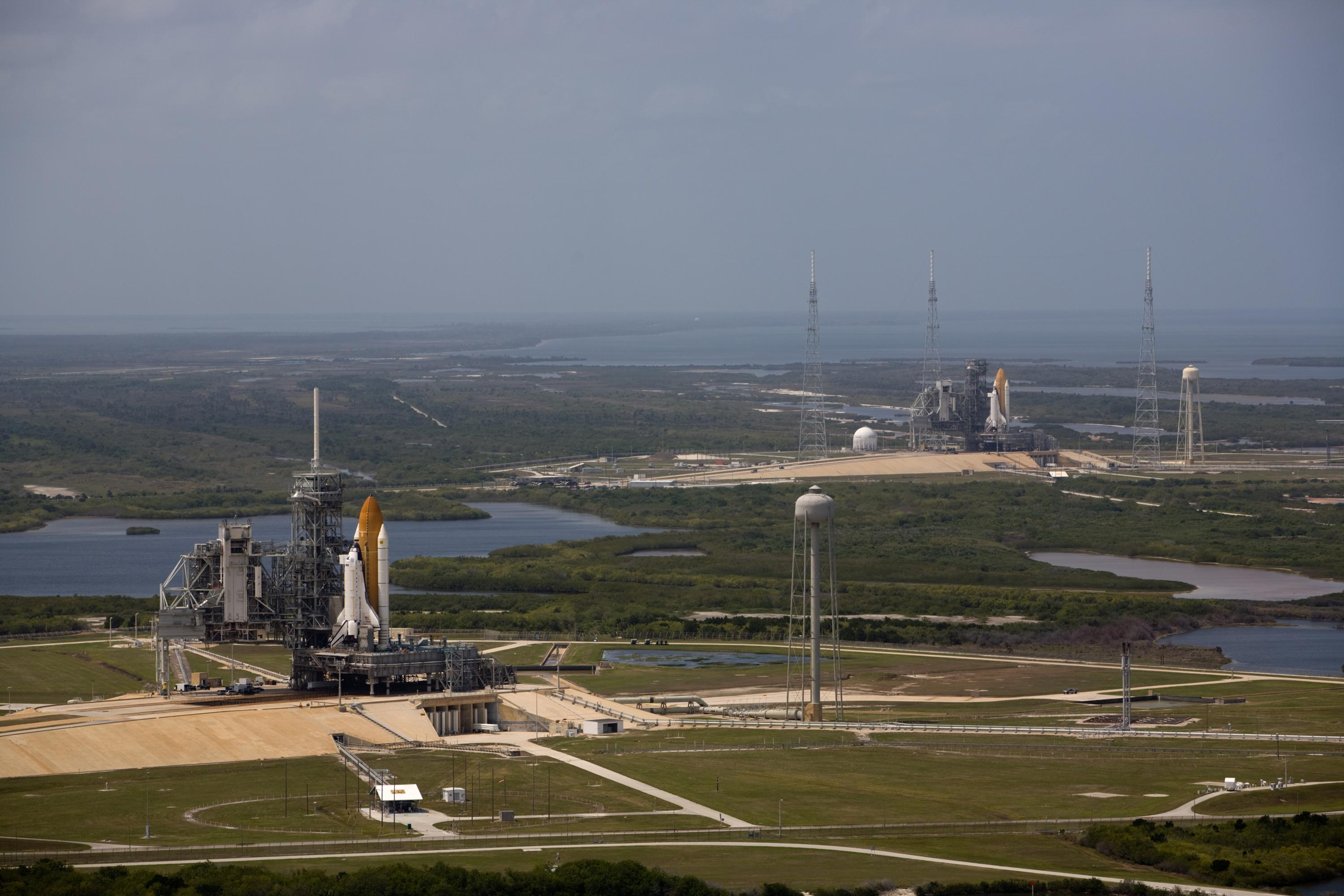
Space Shuttles Atlantis and Endeavour are placed at LC-39A and LC-39B in preparation for the final service mission to the Hubble Space Telescope (May 2009). Endeavour was ready for a contingency mission in case of trouble with Atlantis.

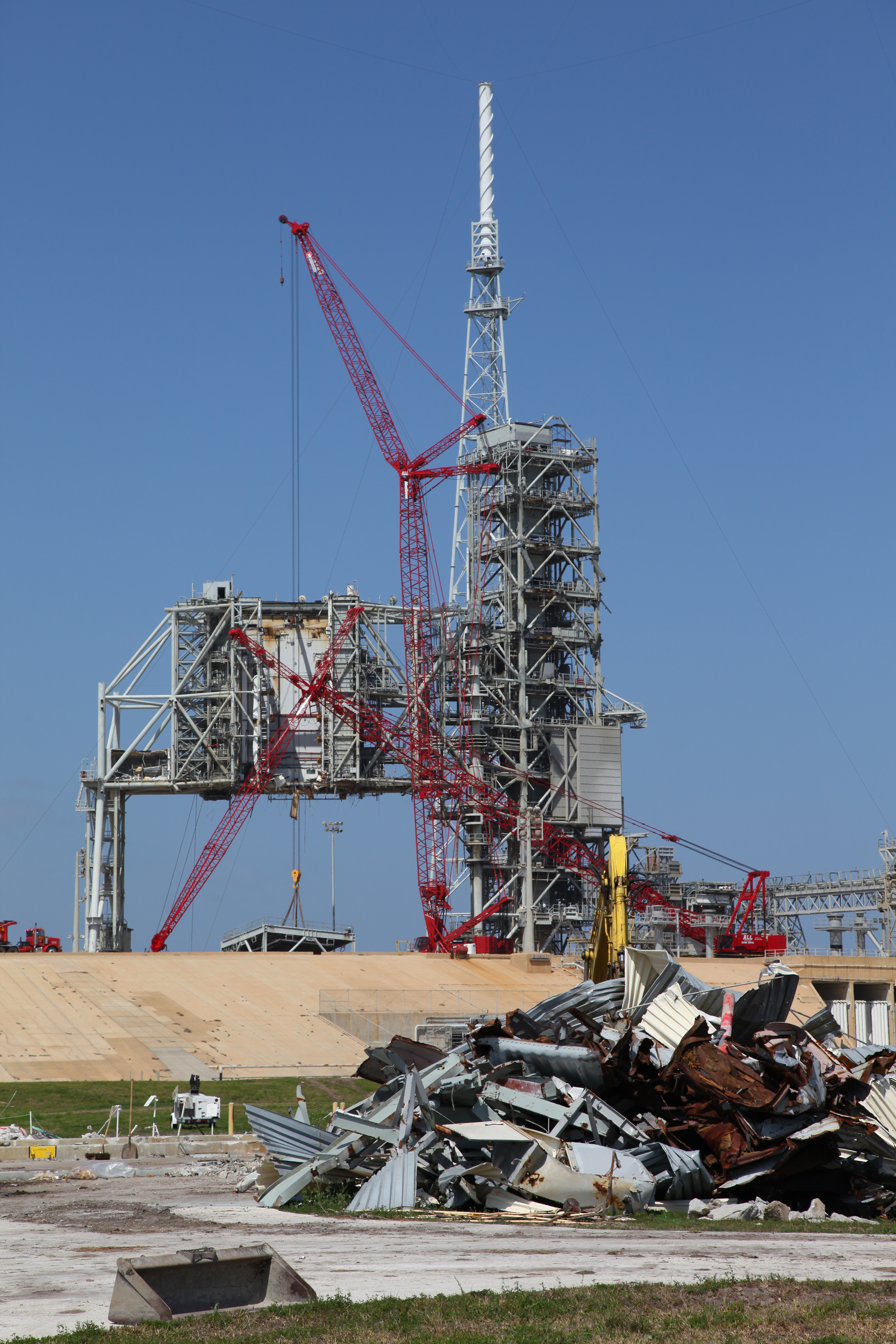
Removal of the top floor of the fixed service structure on LC-39B (March 2011).

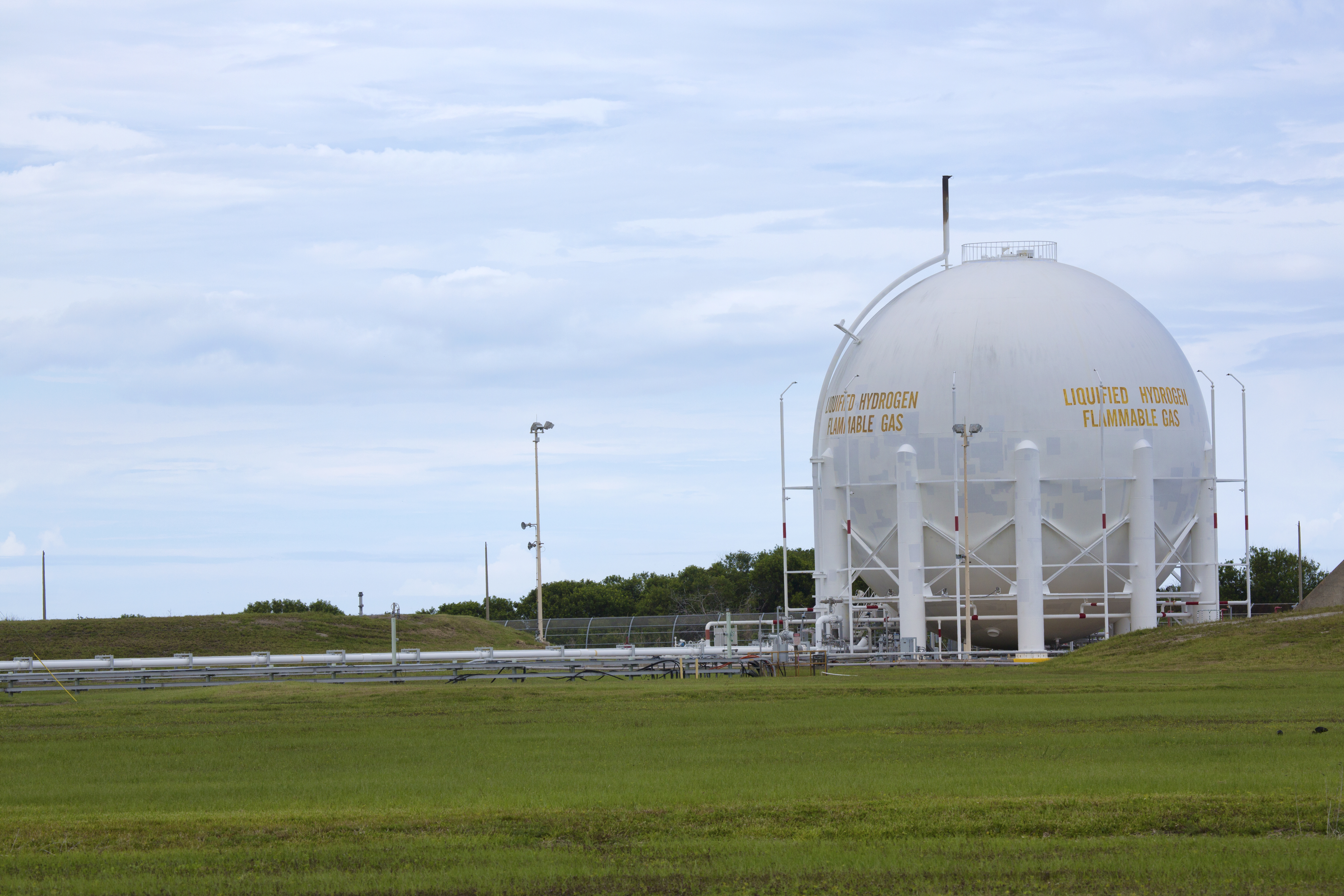
Storage tank for liquid hydrogen fuel located just to the Northeast of Kennedy Space Center's SLS launch pad 39B.

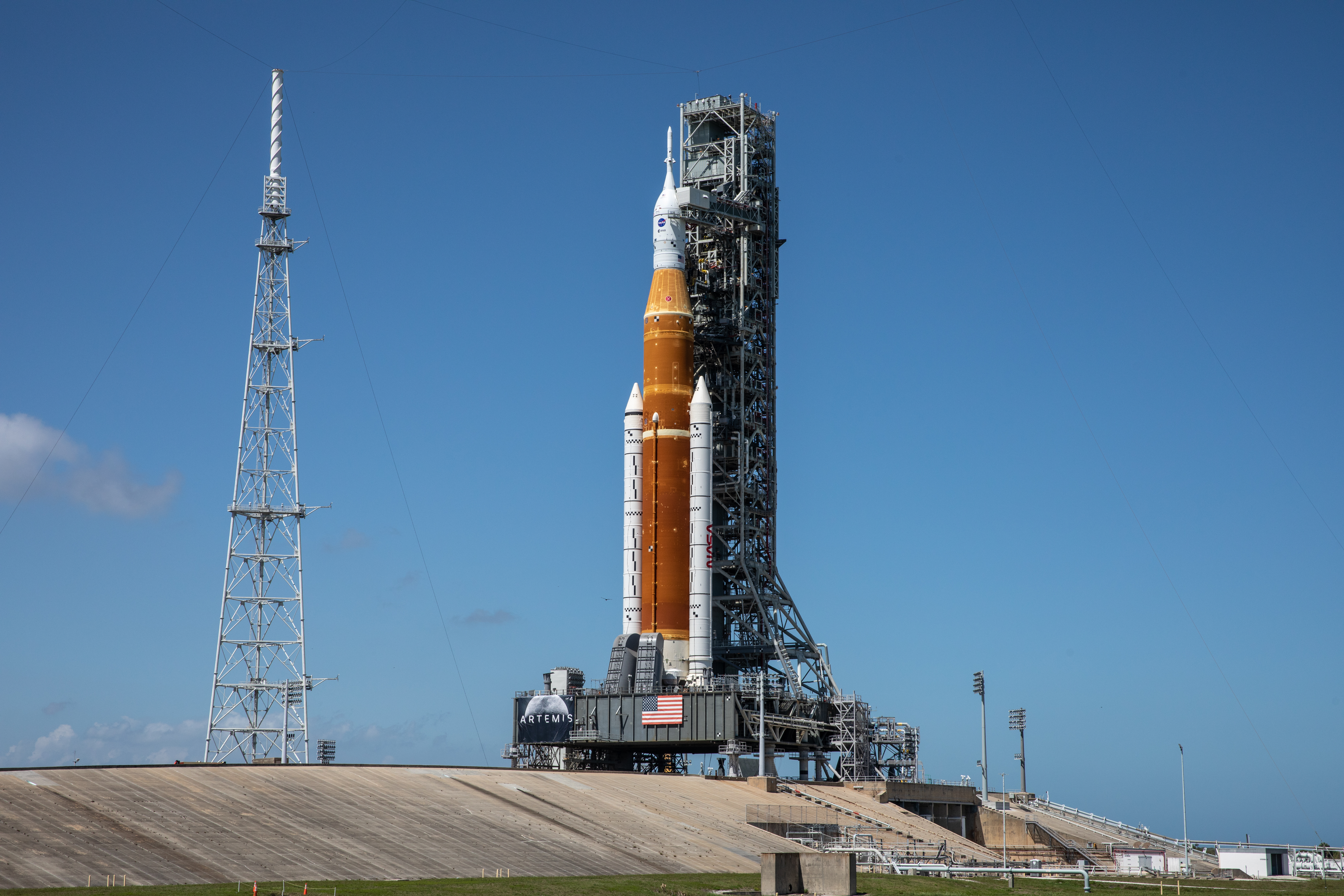
The first Space Launch System rocket on LC-39B for Artemis I.

== See also ==
- List of Cape Canaveral and Merritt Island launch sites
- Kennedy Space Center Launch Complex 39A
- Kennedy Space Center Launch Complex 39B
