= STS-61 =

1993 American crewed spaceflight to the Hubble Space Telescope

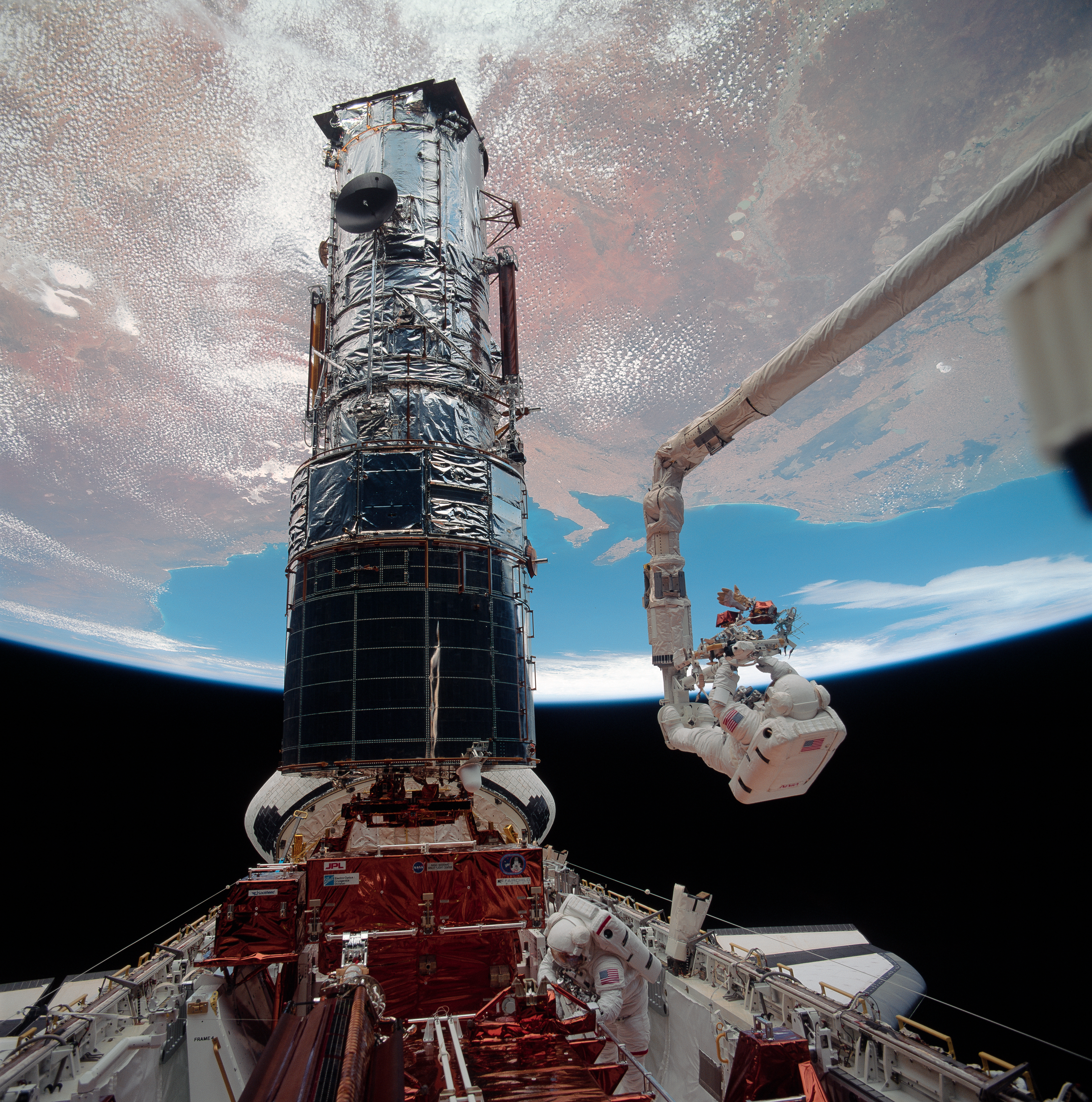
- Musgrave being raised to the top of Hubble by Canadarm, as it sits in Endeavour's payload bay.
- Names: Space Transportation System-61
- Mission type: First Hubble Space Telescope servicing
- Operator: NASA
- COSPAR ID: 1993-075A
- SATCAT no.: 22917
- Mission duration: 10 days, 19 hours, 58 minutes, 33 seconds (achieved)
- Distance travelled: 7,135,464 km (4,433,772 mi)
- Orbits completed: 163

Spacecraft properties
- Spacecraft: Space Shuttle Endeavour
- Launch mass: 113,541 kg (250,315 lb)
- Landing mass: 94,972 kg (209,377 lb)
- Payload mass: 8,011 kg (17,661 lb)

Crew
- Crew size: 7
- Members: Richard O. Covey; Ken Bowersox; Kathryn C. Thornton; Claude Nicollier; Jeffrey A. Hoffman; Story Musgrave; Thomas D. Akers
- EVAs: 5
- EVA duration: 35h, 28m

Start of mission
- Launch date: December 2, 1993, 09:27:00 UTC
- Rocket: Space Shuttle Endeavour
- Launch site: Kennedy Space Center, LC-39B
- Contractor: Rockwell International

End of mission
- Landing date: December 13, 1993, 05:25:33 UTC
- Landing site: Kennedy Space Center, SLF Runway 33

Orbital parameters
- Reference system: Geocentric orbit
- Regime: Low Earth orbit
- Perigee altitude: 291 km (181 mi)
- Apogee altitude: 576 km (358 mi)
- Inclination: 28.45°
- Period: 93.30 minutes

Capture of Hubble Space Telescope
- RMS capture: December 4, 1993, 08:48 UTC
- Berthing date: December 4, 1993, 09:26 UTC
- RMS release: December 9, 1993, 10:26 UTC
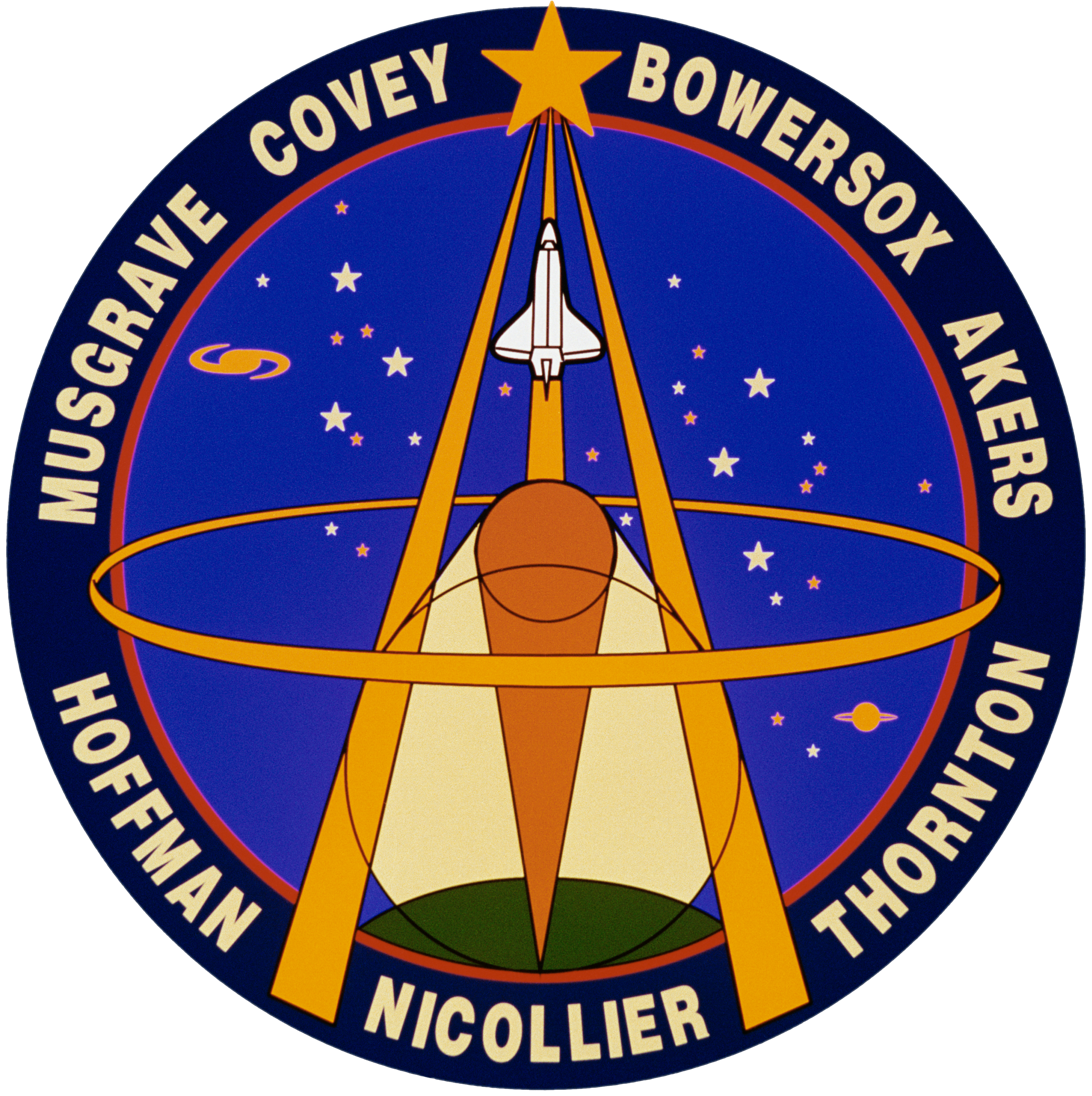
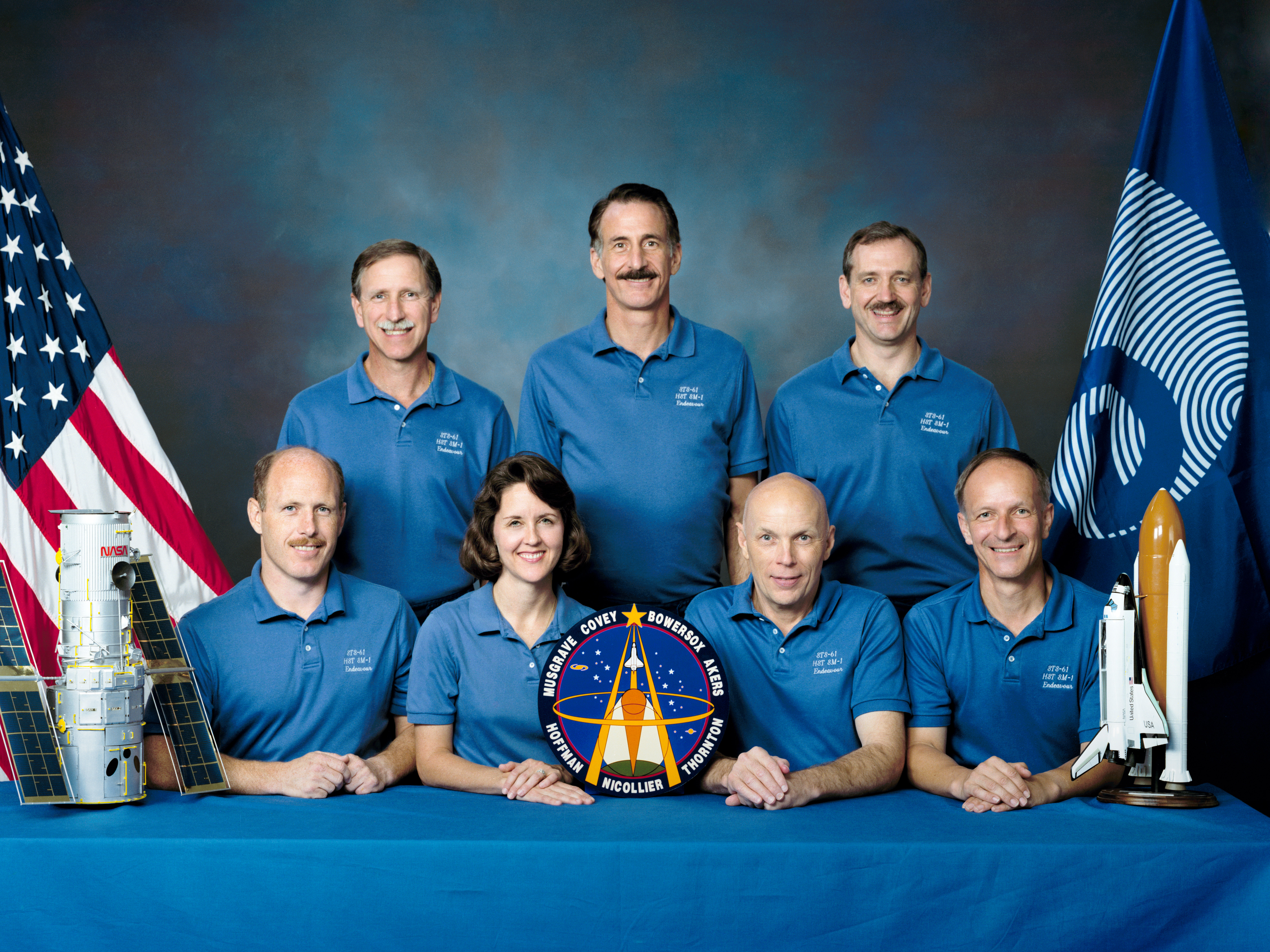
- STS-61 mission patch Standing: Covey, Hoffman, Akers; Seated: Bowersox, Thornton, Musgrave, Nicollier Space Shuttle program Hubble Space Telescope missions

STS-61 was NASA's first Hubble Space Telescope servicing mission, and the fifth flight of the Space Shuttle Endeavour. The mission launched on December 2, 1993, from Kennedy Space Center (KSC) in Florida. The mission restored the spaceborne observatory's vision (marred by spherical aberration in its mirror) with the installation of a new main camera and a corrective optics package (COSTAR). This correction occurred more than three and a half years after the Hubble was launched aboard STS-31 in April 1990. The flight also brought instrument upgrades and new solar arrays to the telescope. With its very heavy workload, the STS-61 mission was one of the most complex in the Shuttle's history.

STS-61 lasted almost 11 days, and crew members made five spacewalks (extravehicular activities (EVAs)), an all-time record; even the re-positioning of Intelsat VI on STS-49 in May 1992 required only four. The flight plan allowed for two additional EVAs, which could have raised the total number to seven; the final two contingency EVAs were not made. In order to complete the mission without too much fatigue, the five EVAs were shared between two pairs of different astronauts alternating their shifts. During the flight, mission specialist Jeffrey A. Hoffman also spun a dreidel for the holiday of Hanukkah to a live audience watching via satellite.

== Crew ==
Position	Astronaut
Commander	(United States) Richard O. Covey; Fourth and last spaceflight
Pilot	(United States) Ken Bowersox; Second spaceflight
Mission Specialist 1	(United States) Kathryn C. Thornton; Third spaceflight
Mission Specialist 2 Flight Engineer	(Switzerland) Claude Nicollier, ESA; Second spaceflight
Mission Specialist 3	(United States) Jeffrey A. Hoffman; Fourth spaceflight
Mission Specialist 4	(United States) Story Musgrave; Fifth spaceflight
Mission Specialist 5	(United States) Thomas Akers; Third spaceflight

=== Backup crew ===
Position	Astronaut
Mission Specialist 4	(United States) Gregory J. Harbaugh; Third spaceflight

=== Spacewalks ===
- Musgrave and Hoffman – EVA 1
  - EVA 1 Start: December 5, 1993 – 03:44 UTC
  - EVA 1 End: December 5, 1993 – 11:38 UTC
  - Duration: 7 hours, 54 minutes
- Thornton and Akers – EVA 2
  - EVA 2 Start: December 6, 1993 – 03:29 UTC
  - EVA 2 End: December 6, 1993 – 10:05 UTC
  - Duration: 6 hours, 36 minutes
- Musgrave and Hoffman – EVA 3
  - EVA 3 Start: December 7, 1993 – 03:35 UTC
  - EVA 3 End: December 7, 1993 – 10:22 UTC
  - Duration: 6 hours, 47 minutes
- Thornton and Akers – EVA 4
  - EVA 4 Start: December 8, 1993 – 03:13 UTC
  - EVA 4 End: December 8, 1993 – 10:03 UTC
  - Duration: 6 hours, 50 minutes
- Musgrave and Hoffman – EVA 5
  - EVA 5 Start: December 9, 1993 – 03:30 UTC
  - EVA 5 End: December 9, 1993 – 10:51 UTC
  - Duration: 7 hours, 21 minutes

=== Crew seat assignments ===
Seat	Launch	Landing	Seats 1–4 are on the flight deck. Seats 5–7 are on the mid-deck.
1	Covey		Seats 1–4 are on the flight deck. Seats 5–7 are on the mid-deck.
2	Bowersox		Seats 1–4 are on the flight deck. Seats 5–7 are on the mid-deck.
3	Thornton	Hoffman	Seats 1–4 are on the flight deck. Seats 5–7 are on the mid-deck.
4	Nicollier		Seats 1–4 are on the flight deck. Seats 5–7 are on the mid-deck.
5	Hoffman	Thornton	Seats 1–4 are on the flight deck. Seats 5–7 are on the mid-deck.
6	Musgrave		Seats 1–4 are on the flight deck. Seats 5–7 are on the mid-deck.
7	Akers		Seats 1–4 are on the flight deck. Seats 5–7 are on the mid-deck.

== Mission highlights ==
=== Launch ===
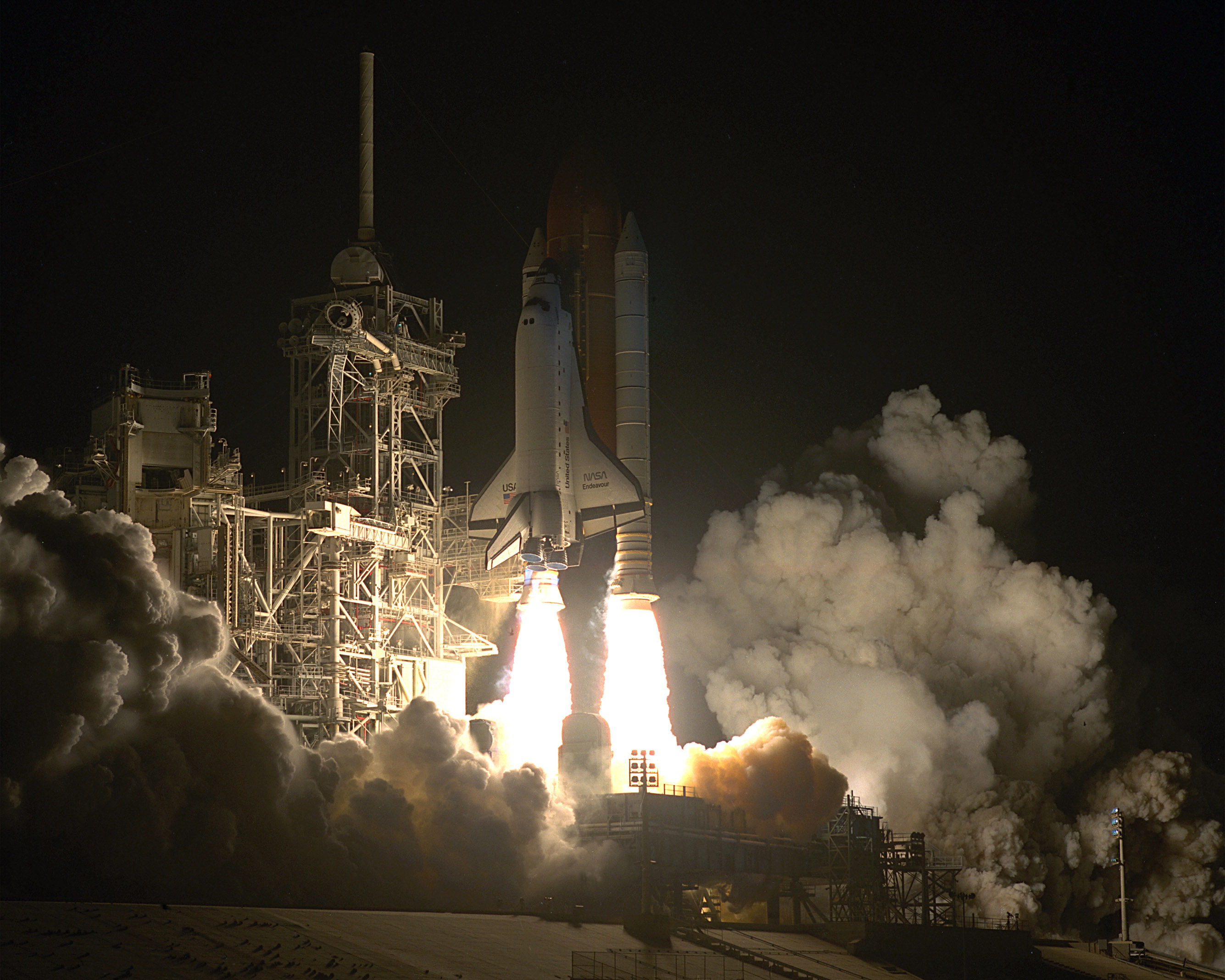
Launch of the first servicing mission

Endeavour was switched from Pad 39A to Pad 39B due to contamination of the Payload Changeout Room after a windstorm on October 30, 1993. The internal HST payload package was not affected because it was tightly sealed, and the contamination appeared to have been caused by sandblasting grit from recent Pad A modifications. On November 18, 1993, Endeavour experienced a failure of a transducer on the elevon hydraulic actuator. To replace the actuator would have required a rollback to the Orbiter Processing Facility (OPF) because access to the actuator was only through the Main Landing Gear wheel well. Since there were 4 delta-P transducers and the Launch commit criteria (LCC) required only 3 of 4, the transducer was depinned and would not be consulted during flight. The flight crew arrived at the KSC Shuttle Landing Facility (SLF) on November 27, 1993, and the payload bay doors were closed at 20:20 UTC on November 28, 1993. The first launch attempt on December 1, 1993, was scrubbed due to weather constraint violations at the Shuttle Landing Facility. Just before the scrub the range was also in a no-go situation due to an 240 m (790 ft) long ship in the restricted sea zone. A 24‑hour scrub turnaround was put into effect with a launch window extending from 09:26 to 10:38 UTC on December 2, 1993. Launch mass was 113,541 kg (250,315 lb). Payload mass was 8,011 kg (17,661 lb). After launch, the astronauts carried out a series of checks on the vehicle and went to sleep seven and a half hours after liftoff.

Attempt	Planned	Result	Turnaround	Reason	Decision point	Weather go (%)	Notes
1	1 Dec 1993, 4:57:00 am	Scrubbed	—	Weather	1 Dec 1993, 6:04 am (T−00:05:00)		Crosswinds and cloud cover at KSC.
2	2 Dec 1993, 4:27:00 am	Success	0 days 23 hours 30 minutes			60	

=== Flight Day 2 ===
Endeavour performed a series of burns that allowed the shuttle to close in on the Hubble Space Telescope at a rate of 110 km (68 mi) per 95-minute orbit. The crew made a detailed inspection of the payload and checked out both the robot arm (Canadarm) and the spacesuits. All of Endeavour's systems functioned well as the crew got a full day's sleep in preparation for the evening's rendezvous. At the end of Flight Day 2, Endeavour was 350 km (220 mi) behind HST and closing.

=== Flight Day 3 ===
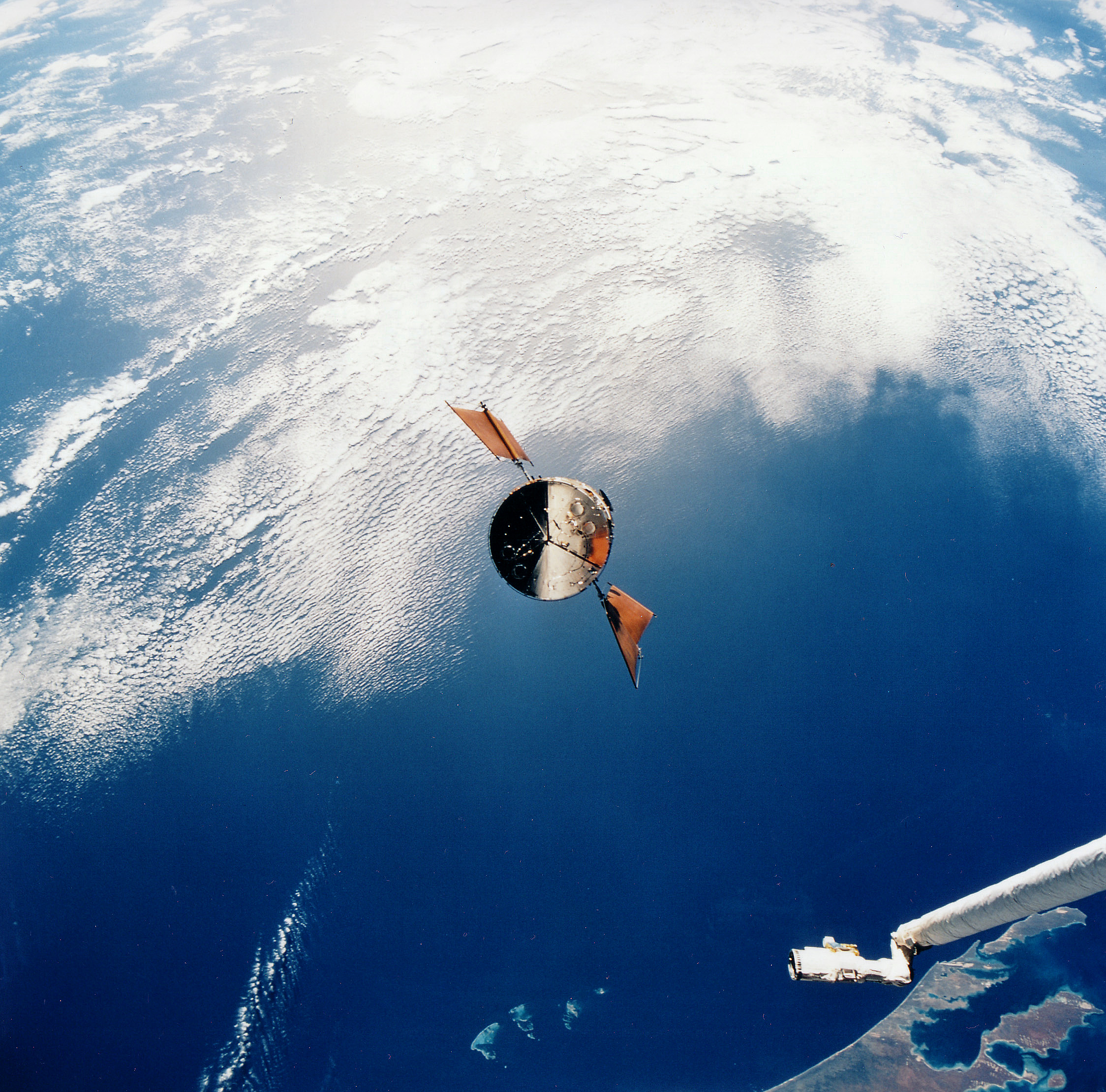
Approaching the telescope.

HST was sighted by astronaut Jeffrey A. Hoffman using binoculars, whereupon he noted that the right-hand solar array was bent at a 90° angle. These 12 m (39 ft) solar arrays, provided by the European Space Agency (ESA), were scheduled to be replaced during the second spacewalk because they wobbled 16 times a day (as the telescope heated up and cooled off while passing from the nighttime side of the Earth to the daytime side and vice versa), thus disturbing Hubble's ability to maintain precise pointing.

The closing speed remained the same until the next reaction control system (RCS) firing, at 02:34 UTC, December 4, 1993. This height-adjusting ("NH" for "Nominal Height") burn changed the shuttle's velocity by 1.4 m/s (4.6 ft/s), modified the high point of Endeavour's orbit, and fine-tuned its course toward a point 64 km (40 mi) behind HST. The next burn, an orbital maneuvering system firing designated NC3, was scheduled for 03:22 UTC and changed Endeavour's velocity by 3.8 m/s (12 ft/s). Endeavour's catch-up rate was adjusted to about 30 km (19 mi) per orbit and put it 15 km (9.3 mi) behind HST two orbits later. A third burn of just 55 mm/s (2.2 in/s), called NPC and designed to fine-tune the spacecraft's ground track, was executed at 15:58 UTC. The multi-axis RCS terminal initiation (TI) burn, which placed Endeavour on an intercept course with HST and set up commander Dick Covey's manual control of the final stages of the rendezvous, occurred at 05:35 UTC. Covey maneuvered Endeavour within 9.1 m (30 ft) of the free-flying HST before mission specialist Claude Nicollier used Endeavour's robot arm to grapple the telescope at 08:48 UTC, when the orbiter was several hundred kilometers east of Australia over the south Pacific Ocean. Nicollier berthed the telescope in the shuttle's cargo bay at 09:26 UTC. Everything was on schedule for the first planned spacewalk scheduled for 04:52 UTC. After capture, additional visual inspections were performed using the camera mounted on the 15 m (49 ft)-long shuttle remote manipulator arm (Canadarm).

Earlier in the day, controllers at the Goddard Space Flight Center (GSFC's) Space Telescope Operations Control Center uplinked commands to stow HST's two high-gain antennas. Controllers received indications that both antennas had nested properly against the body of the telescope, but microswitches on two latches of one antenna and one latch on the other did not send the "ready to latch" signal to the ground. Controllers decided not to attempt to close the latches, as the antennas were in a stable configuration. The situation was not expected to affect plans for rendezvous, grapple and servicing of the telescope.

=== Spacewalk #1 (Flight Day 4) ===
Story Musgrave and Jeffrey A. Hoffman started the first EVA about an hour earlier than scheduled by stepping into the cargo bay at 03:46 UTC. They began by unpacking tools, safety tethers and work platforms. Hoffman then installed a foot restraint platform onto the end of the shuttle's remote manipulator arm (Canadarm), which he then snapped into his feet. Nicollier drove the arm from within the shuttle and moved Hoffman around the telescope. Meanwhile, Musgrave installed protective covers on Hubble's aft low gain antenna and on exposed voltage bearing connector covers. The astronauts then opened the HST equipment bay doors and installed another foot restraint inside the telescope. Musgrave assisted Hoffman into the restraint and Hoffman proceeded to replace two sets of Rate Sensing Units (RSUs). These units contain gyroscopes that help keep Hubble pointed in the right direction. By 17:24 UTC, Hoffman had finished replacing RSU-2 (containing Gyros 2–3 and 2–4) and then replaced RSU-3 (containing Gyros 3–5 and 3–6). The astronauts then spent about 50 minutes preparing equipment for use during the second space walk and then replaced a pair of electrical control units (ECUs) (ECU-3 and ECU-1) that control RSU-3 and RSU-1. The astronauts also changed eight fuse plugs that protect the telescope's electrical circuits. Hubble now had a full set of six healthy gyroscopes.

The astronauts struggled with the latches on the gyro door when two of four gyro door bolts did not reset after the astronauts installed two new gyro packages. Engineers who evaluated the situation speculated that when the doors were unlatched and opened, a temperature change might have caused them to expand or contract enough to keep the bolts from being reset. With the efforts of determined astronauts in Endeavour's payload bay and persistent engineers on the ground, all four bolts finally latched and locked after the two spacewalkers worked simultaneously at the top and bottom of the doors. Musgrave anchored himself at the bottom of the doors with a payload retention device which enabled him to use some body force against the doors. Hoffman, who was attached to the robot arm, worked at the top of the doors. The duo successfully latched the doors when they simultaneously latched the top and bottom latches.

The spacewalkers also set up the payload bay for mission specialists Tom Akers and Kathy Thornton who would replace the telescope's two solar arrays during the second spacewalk. In anticipation of that spacewalk, Musgrave and Hoffman prepared the solar array carrier which is located in the forward portion of the cargo bay, and attached a foot restraint on the telescope to assist in the solar array replacement.

Musgrave and Hoffman's spacewalk became the second longest spacewalk in NASA history, lasting 7 hours 50 minutes. The longest spacewalk occurred on STS-49 in May 1992 during Endeavour's maiden flight. Spacewalking crew members during that flight were Thomas D. Akers, Richard J. Hieb and Pierre J. Thuot. A number of spacewalks have since surpassed these. (See Lists of spacewalks and moonwalks)

In spite of the kink in array (about a panel and a half from the end), after a review by HST program managers, flight controllers decided to continue with the pre-flight plan and attempt to roll up and retract the solar arrays at the end of the first EVA. The stowage of the solar arrays is a two step process with the initial step involving the rolling up of the solar arrays and the second step involving the actual folding up of the arrays against the telescope. Each array stands on a four-foot mast that supports a retractable wing of solar panels 12 m (39 ft) long and 2.5 m (8 ft 2 in) wide. They supply the telescope with 4.5 kW of power.

=== Spacewalk #2 ===
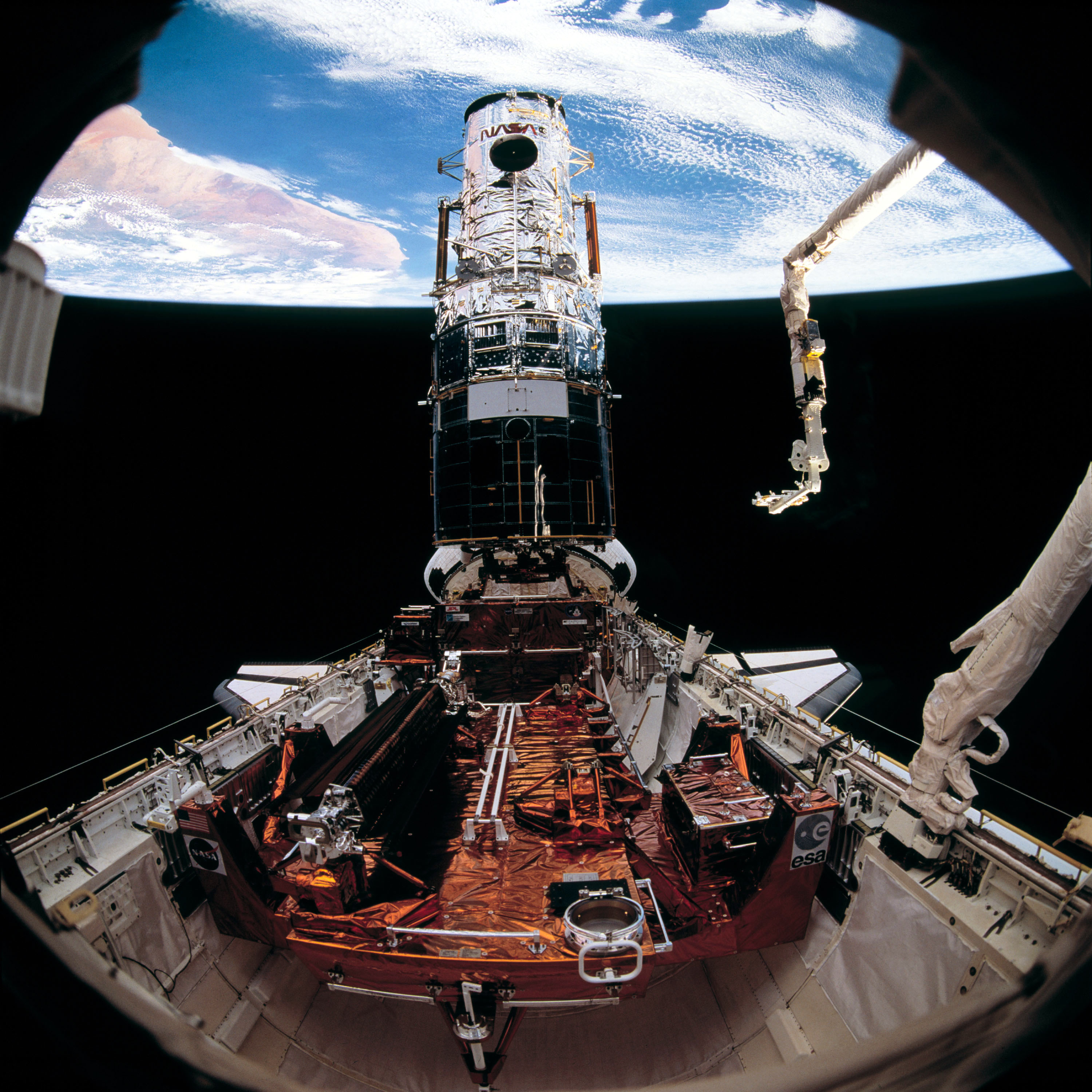
Hubble with new solar arrays installed. The remaining original array is on the SAC in the foreground.

Flight Day 5 began on Monday afternoon (December 6, 1993) at 15:35 UTC. Astronauts Thomas D. Akers and Kathryn C. Thornton replaced HST's solar arrays during the second planned EVA (Thornton had red dashed stripes on her spacesuit while Tom Akers had diagonal red dashed stripes, which helped flight controllers tell the two spacewalkers apart). At the start of the EVA, the pressure in Thornton's vent garment was 1.4 kPa (0.20 psi) instead of the normal pressure of 28 to 41 kPa (4.1 to 5.9 psi). This was due to a possible ice plug in the suit's plumbing which shortly melted. Thornton then topped off her suit. There were also other problems with Thornton's EVA suit. Her communications receiver malfunctioned in a way that allowed her to communicate to Akers but not to Mission Control Center, Houston. The crew decided to use a technique of relaying all commands for Thornton via Akers instead of switching to the backup comm channel. The backup channel is used for suit biomedical telemetry and would have limited Mission Control's ability to monitor that telemetry.

Akers started the EVA by installing a foot restraint on the Canadarm for Thornton and proceeded to begin disconnecting three electrical connectors and a clamp assembly on the solar array. He had a slight problem with the clamp assembly but had the connectors demated by 04:17 UTC. Thornton held the array in place so that it would not drift freely after being detached. The solar arrays weigh 160 kg (350 lb) and are 5 m (16 ft) long when folded. The astronauts dismounted the damaged array at 04:40 UTC above the Sahara (during a nighttime pass to minimize electrical activity), and Thornton held the array until the next daylight pass (approximately 12 minutes) before throwing it overboard at 04:52 UTC over Somalia. The jettison during daylight allowed the astronauts and flight controllers to accurately track its position and relative velocity. The release by Thornton imparted zero velocity to the arrays and then the orbiter did a small burn to put some distance between it and the array. The array, moving away from Endeavour at 1.5 m/s (4.9 ft/s), separated about 18 to 19 km (11 to 12 mi) each orbit. The crew then installed a new array, (finishing around 06:40 UTC) and rotated the telescope 180°. They then replaced the second solar array which was stowed away for return to ESA. After the 6.5 hours EVA, successful functional tests were performed by the Space Telescope Operations Control Center (STOCC) on four of HST's six gyros. Gyros 1 and 2 were not able to be tested due to the orientation of the telescope and were tested during the crew sleep period Monday night (December 6, 1993).

=== Spacewalk #3 (Flight Day 6) ===
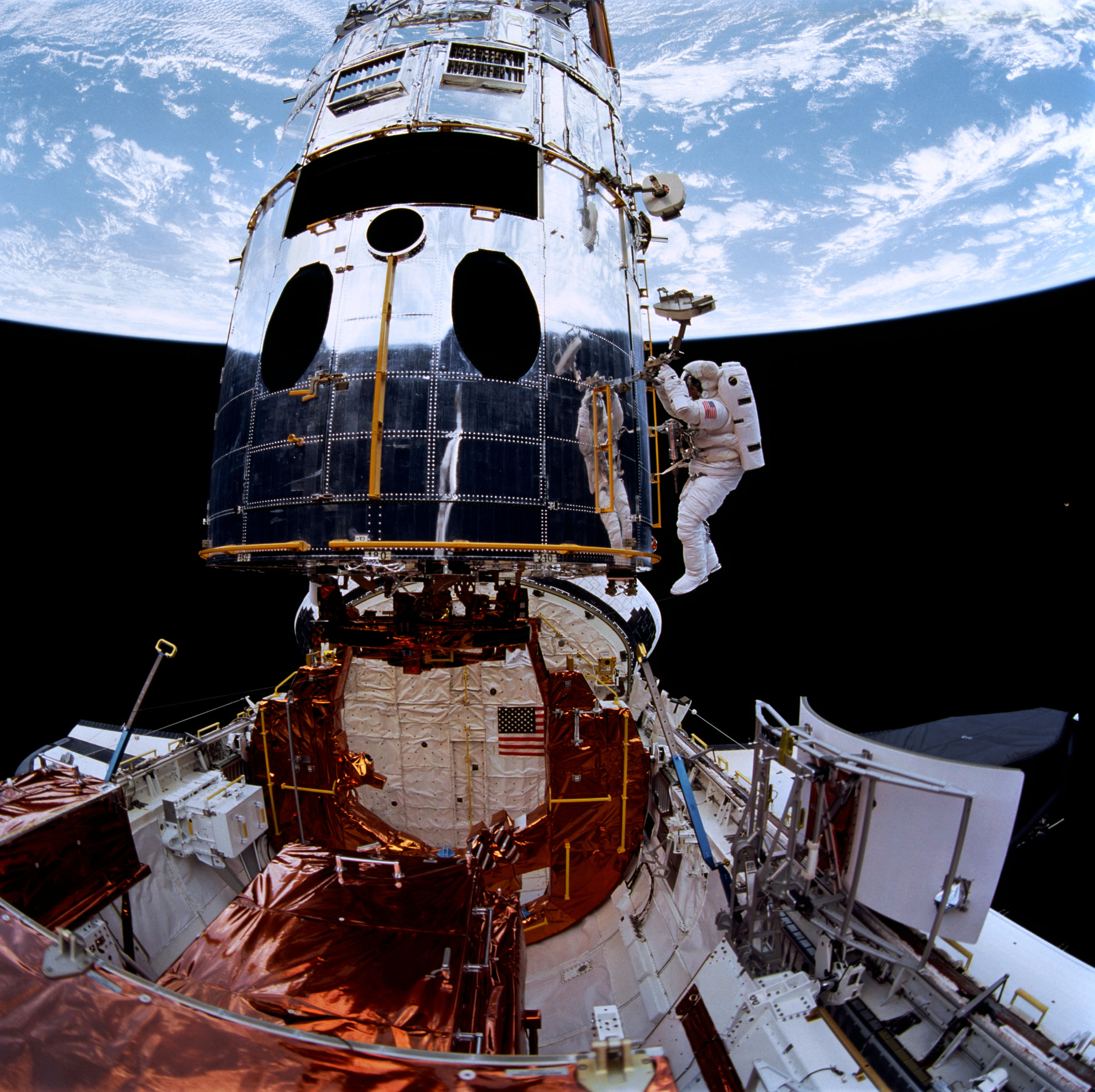
Musgrave and Hoffman prepare to install the new Wide Field and Planetary Camera, visible on the payload bay sill.

The third EVA began December 7, 1993, at 03:34 UTC while Endeavour was over Australia. Hoffman installed guide studs on the Wide Field and Planetary Camera (WF/PC, commonly referred to as "Whiffpick") and prepared the WF/PC for removal while Musgrave set up a work platform and worked on opening an access door to allow observation of WF/PC status lights. Hoffman attached the support handle to the WF/PC and, with assistance by Claude Nicollier on the arm and a free floating Story Musgrave, removed the WF/PC during the night pass starting at 04:41 UTC. The WF/PC was clear of the telescope by 04:48 UTC and moved back into its storage container. A protective hood was then removed on the new Wide Field and Planetary Camera 2 (WFPC2) (protecting its fragile external mirror) and the 280 kg (620 lb) WFPC2 was then installed at 06:05 UTC. Ground controllers then ran an Aliveness Test and 35 minutes later reported that the new camera successfully performed its series of initial tests. The new Wide Field and Planetary Camera 2 had a higher rating than the previous model, especially in the ultraviolet range, and included its own spherical aberration correction system.

Following the WFPC2 installation, Hoffman changed out two magnetometers on board HST. The magnetometers, which are located at the top of the telescope, are the satellite's "compass". They enable HST to find its orientation with respect to the Earth's magnetic field. Both original units were suffering from problems of background noise. During installation, two pieces peeled off the magnetometers. The EVA lasted 6 hours and 47 minutes.

=== Spacewalk #4 (Flight Day 7) ===
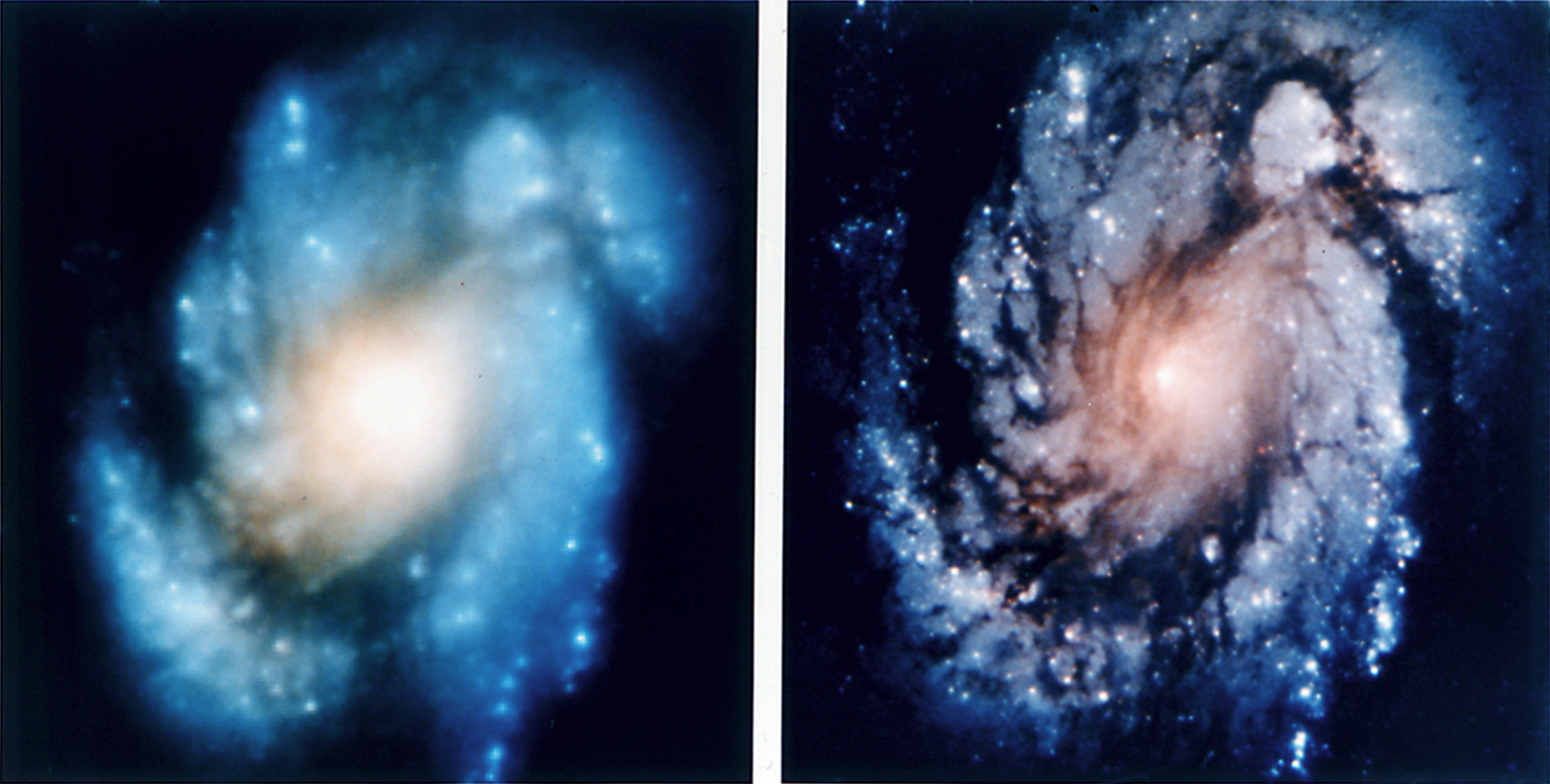
Hubble Telescope images before and after the STS-61 mission

The fourth EVA began on December 8, 1993, while Endeavour was flying over Egypt at 03:13 UTC with Thornton and Akers. The primary task of the EVA was to replace HST's High Speed Photometer (HSP) with the Corrective Optics Space Telescope Axial Replacement (COSTAR) system which would correct HST's spherical aberration of the main mirror for all instruments except the WFPC2 camera, which had its own built-in corrective optics. Akers received a go for the opening of HST's -V2 aft shroud doors at 22:45 EST. The doors were scheduled to be opened during a night pass to minimize thermal changes and reduce the possibility of out-gassing of components that could contaminate the optics. The High Speed Photometer (HSP) was powered down at 03:54 UTC and the door opening started at 03:57 UTC. Shortly after partially opening the door, the astronauts practiced reclosing the door. The door exhibited the same reluctance upon closing that was experienced on different doors during previous EVAs. The doors were fully opened by 04:00 UTC and four power and data connectors plus one ground strap were disconnected from the HSP. The HSP was removed at 04:27 UTC and then reinserted to practice for the COSTAR installation. HSP was then parked on the side of the payload bay while COSTAR was removed from stowage and successfully installed in the HST by about 05:35 UTC. The astronauts closed the HST equipment bay doors and stowed the HSP. At 07:25 UTC they started upgrading HST's onboard computer by bolting on an electronics package containing additional computer memory and a co-processor. The computer system was then reactivated and passed its functionality tests at 09:41 UTC. The EVA was 100% successful and lasted for 6 hours 50 minutes.

Pilot Kenneth D. Bowersox, using Endeavour's RCS, performed two orbital maneuvers and boosted HST from a 594 by 587 km (369 by 365 mi) orbit to a 596 by 594 km (370 by 369 mi) circular orbit at 02:14 UTC. COSTAR functional tests were also completed. There was some concern about the health of the onboard HST DF-224 computer and recently installed memory and co-processor when a memory dump failed. After much analysis by a team at the GSFC, it was determined that the dump failure was due to noise on the communications link between the spacecraft and the ground.

=== Spacewalk #5 (Flight Day 8) ===
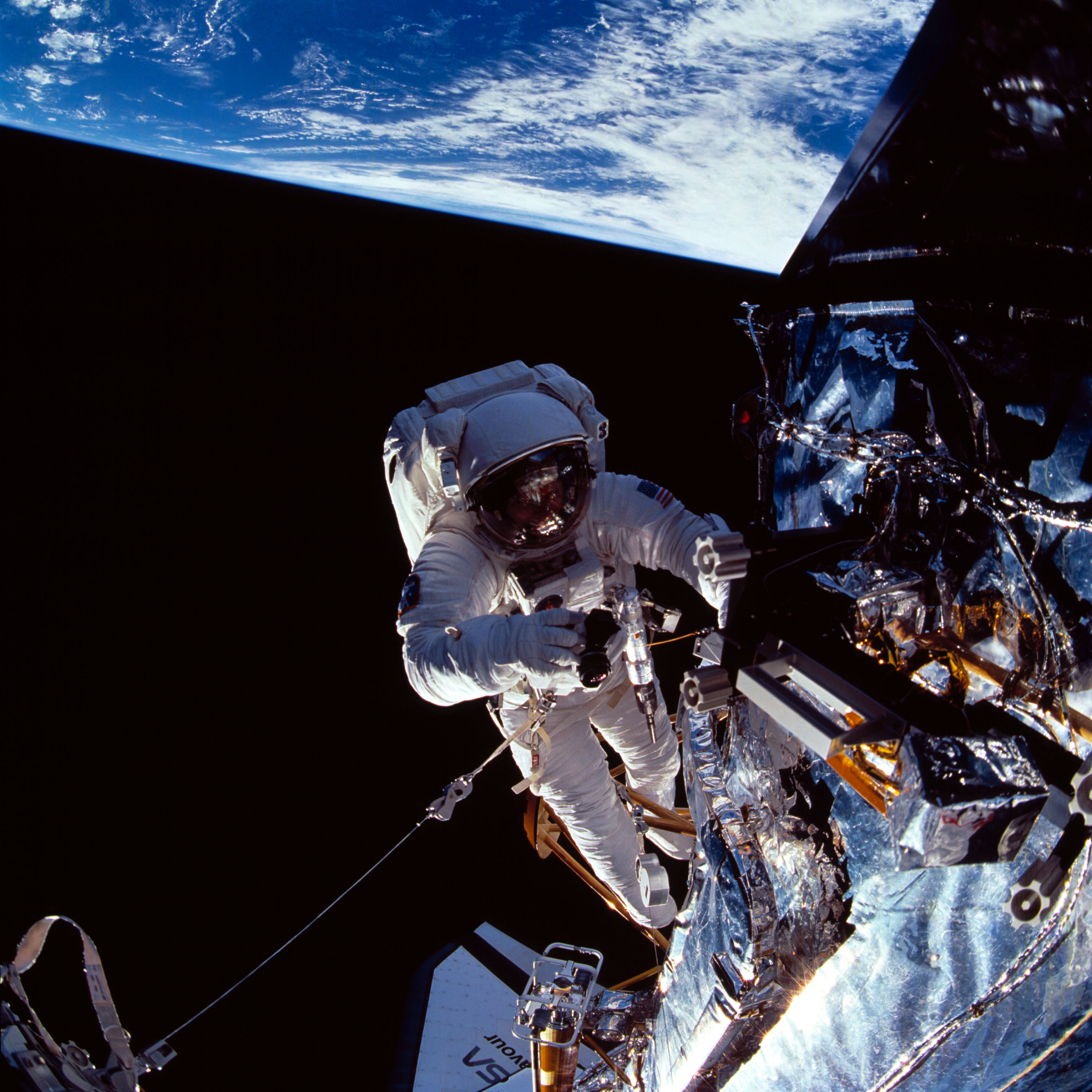
Musgrave near the top of the telescope

The fifth EVA began on December 9, 1993, at 03:14 UTC with a "go" for airlock depress over the Indian Ocean with Musgrave and Hoffman performing the EVA. Musgrave's EVA suit failed its initial leak check, and Musgrave performed steps on the 34 kPa (4.9 psi) contingency checklist. He rotated the EVA suit's lower arm joints and the suit passed two subsequent leak checks. The EVA started at 10:30 UTC and lasted 7 hours 21 minutes.

Musgrave's and Hoffman's first task was to replace the Solar Array Drive Electronics (SADE) and they began the SADE operation while ground controllers initiated the first step in solar array deployment by commanding the Primary Drive Mechanism (PDM). Endeavour was placed in free drift to disable any RCS firings that could disrupt the solar arrays and the PDM motors were engaged at 03:48 UTC. The latches were unlocked but the arrays failed to rotate to the deploy position. No motion was detected and the STOCC sent commands to drive a single array with two motors with no success. Finally, the astronauts cranked the deployment mechanism by hand and deployment was successful. After the SADE was replaced the crew fitted an electrical connection to the Goddard High Resolution Spectrograph at 08:30 UTC and it passed its functionality test. The crew then installed some covers on the magnetometers, fabricated on board by Claude Nicollier and Kenneth D. Bowersox. These covers would contain any debris caused by the older magnetometers that showed some signs of UV decay. The EVA ended at 05:51 EST bringing the total EVA time for this mission to 35 hours 28 minutes. During this flight day, Hoffman spun a dreidel in front of a live audience for the holiday of Hanukkah and brought a travel Hanukkah menorah. The HST High Gain Antenna (HGA) was deployed at 11:49 UTC and completed by 11:56 UTC. Release time for HST was set for 07:08 UTC.

=== Release of Hubble and landing ===
Flight Day 9 began on December 9, 1993, but concerns about one of HST's four onboard Data Interface Units (DIUs) delayed release. Each of the 16 kg (35 lb) DIUs transfer data between the HST's main computer, solar arrays and other critical systems. A failure on Side A of DIU #2 experienced erratic current fluctuations and some data dropouts. Controllers at the STOCC and mission control came up with a troubleshooting procedure to determine the extent of the problem. HST was transferred to internal power and disconnected from its power umbilical at 04:43 UTC. Controllers then switched channels on the DIU from the A side to the B side and then back to the A side. They determined HST should be deployed. The drum brakes on the new solar array were applied to prevent them from vibrating during future observations. Claude Nicollier then took hold of the satellite with the Canadarm. The satellite was then lifted and moved away from Endeavour. The telescope's aperture door was then reopened (a 33-minute procedure) and then released at 10:26 UTC. Commander Dick Covey and pilot Kenneth D. Bowersox fired Endeavour's small maneuvering jets and moved the shuttle slowly away from HST. Landing of the Shuttle occurred at Kennedy Space Center on Runway 33 at 05:26 UTC on December 13, 1993.

=== Post-landing crew appearances ===
The STS-61 crew appeared in an episode of the American TV show Home Improvement. Season 3, Episode 24, titled "Reality Bytes", aired May 18, 1994. The Hubble repair crew appeared on the fictional Tool Time segment, where they showed some of the tools they used in space. During the closing credits, Covey also presented the cast and crew of Home Improvement with a frame containing a flag, crew patch and some photographs. The flag and patch had flown around four million miles in space.

== See also ==
- Hubble Space Telescope
- List of human spaceflights
- List of Space Shuttle missions
- Nikon NASA F4
- Space Shuttle
