= NASA Astronaut Group 11 =

1985 human spaceflight selection of 13 candidates

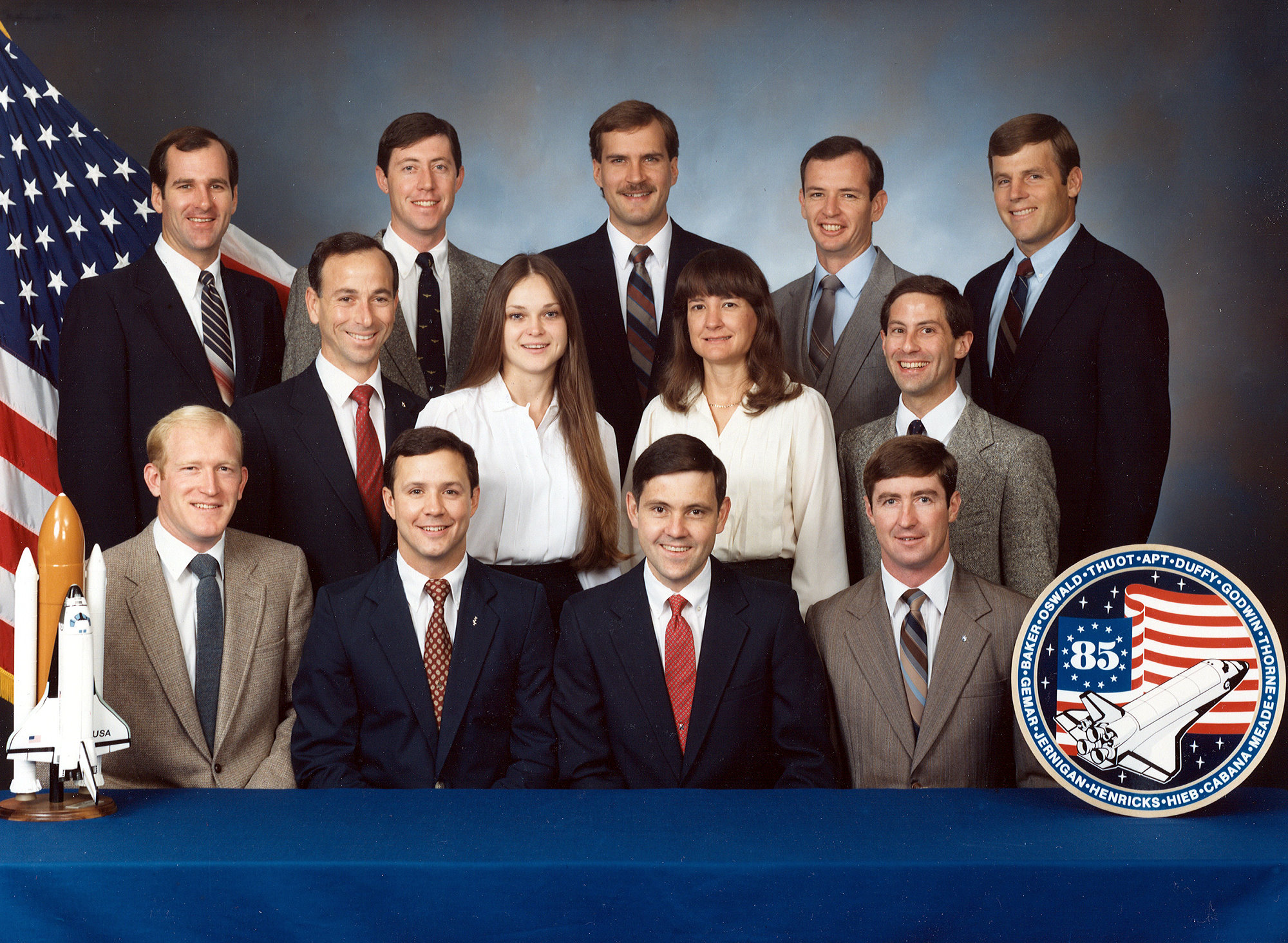
- The Astronauts of Group 11
- Year selected: 1985
- Number selected: 13

NASA Astronaut Group 11 was a group of 13 NASA astronauts announced on 4 June 1985.

== Group members ==
=== Pilots ===
- Michael A. Baker (born 1953), U.S. Navy (4 flights)

STS-43 Atlantis — August 1991 — Pilot — Tracking and Data Relay Satellite deployment
STS-52 Columbia — October/November 1992 — Pilot — LAGEOS-II deployment and operation of the U.S. Microgravity Payload-1 (USMP-1)
STS-68 Endeavour — September/October 1994 — Commander — Radar imaging
STS-81 Atlantis — January 1997 — Commander — fifth Shuttle-Mir mission

- Robert D. Cabana (born 1949), U.S. Marine Corps (4 flights) - NASA Associate Administrator (2021-2023)

STS-41 Discovery — October 1990 — Pilot — Ulysses probe deployment
STS-53 Discovery — December 1992 — Pilot — classified United States Department of Defense payload
STS-65 Columbia — July 1994 — Commander — second International Microgravity Laboratory mission
STS-88 Endeavour — December 1998 — Commander — first Space Shuttle mission to the ISS

- Brian Duffy (born 1953), U.S. Air Force (4 flights)

STS-45 Atlantis — March/April 1992 — Pilot — Spacelab mission
STS-57 Endeavour — June/July 1993 — Pilot — SPACEHAB mission
STS-72 Endeavour — January 1996 — Commander — capture and return of Space Flyer Unit (SFU)
STS-92 Discovery — October 2000 — Commander — ISS assembly flight and 100th mission of the Space Shuttle

- Terence T. Henricks (born 1952), U.S. Air Force (4 flights)

STS-44 Atlantis — November/December 1991 — Pilot — Defense Support Program (DSP) satellite deployment
STS-55 Columbia — April/May 1993 — Pilot — Spacelab mission
STS-70 Discovery — July 1995 — Commander — Tracking and Data Relay Satellite (TDRS) deployment
STS-78 Columbia — June/July 1996 — Commander — Spacelab mission

- Stephen S. Oswald (born 1951), U.S. Navy (3 flights)

STS-42 Discovery — January 1992 — Pilot — Spacelab mission
STS-56 Discovery — April 1993 — Pilot — Atmospheric Laboratory for Applications and Science-2 (ATLAS-2) operation
STS-67 Endeavour — March 1995 — Commander — Spacelab mission

- Stephen Thorne (1953–1986), U.S. Navy

Died in an airplane accident before he could finish astronaut training.

=== Mission specialists ===
- Jerome Apt (born 1949), Physicist (4 flights)

STS-37 Atlantis — April 1991 — Mission Specialist — Compton Gamma Ray Observatory (CGRO) deployment
STS-47 Endeavour — September 1992 — Mission Specialist — Spacelab mission
STS-59 Endeavour — April 1994 — Mission Specialist — Spaceborne Imaging Radar-C (SIR-C) operation
STS-79 Atlantis — September 1996 — Mission Specialist — first shuttle mission to a fully completed Mir space station

- Charles D. Gemar (born 1955), U.S. Army (3 flights)

STS-38 Atlantis — November 1990 — Mission Specialist — classified United States Department of Defense payload
STS-48 Discovery — September 1991 — Mission Specialist — Upper Atmosphere Research Satellite deployment
STS-62 Columbia — March 1994 — Mission Specialist — operation of the U.S. Microgravity Payload-2 (USMP-2)

- Linda M. Godwin (born 1952), Scientist (4 flights) - Former Assistant to the Director for Exploration, Flight Crew Operations Directorate at the Johnson Space Center

STS-37 Atlantis — April 1991 — Mission Specialist — Compton Gamma Ray Observatory (CGRO) deployment
STS-59 Endeavour — April 1994 — Mission Specialist — Spaceborne Imaging Radar-C (SIR-C) operation
STS-76 Atlantis — March 1996 — Mission Specialist — third Shuttle-Mir mission
STS-108 Endeavour — December 2001 — Mission Specialist — ISS crew rotation mission

- Richard Hieb (born 1955), Engineer (3 flights)

STS-39 Discovery — April/May 1991 — Mission Specialist — United States Department of Defense research mission
STS-49 Endeavour — May 1992 — Mission Specialist — Maiden flight of Endeavour, Intelsat 603 capture and redeployment to a correct orbit, first and only (as of 2019) EVA involving three astronauts
STS-65 Columbia — July 1994 — Mission Specialist — second International Microgravity Laboratory mission

- Tamara E. Jernigan (born 1959), Scientist (5 flights)

STS-40 Columbia — June 1991 — Mission Specialist — fifth Spacelab mission and the first dedicated solely to biology
STS-52 Columbia — October/November 1992 — Mission Specialist — LAGEOS-II deployment and operation of the U.S. Microgravity Payload-1 (USMP-1)
STS-67 Endeavour — March 1995 — Mission Specialist — Spacelab mission
STS-80 Columbia — November/December 1996 — Mission Specialist — Orbiting and Retrievable Far and Extreme Ultraviolet Spectrometer-Shuttle Pallet Satellite II (ORFEUS-SPAS II) and Wake Shield Facility-3 deployment, operation as free-floating satellites and recapture
STS-96 Discovery — May/June 1999 — Mission Specialist — ISS assembly and logistics, first Space Shuttle flight to dock with the ISS

- Carl J. Meade (born 1950), U.S. Air Force (3 flights)

STS-38 Atlantis — November 1990 — Mission Specialist — classified United States Department of Defense payload
STS-50 Columbia — June/July 1992 — Mission Specialist — U.S. Microgravity Laboratory 1 Spacelab mission
STS-64 Discovery — September 1994 — Mission Specialist — Lidar In-space Technology Experiment (LITE) operation and the last untethered U.S. extravehicular activity (EVA) during the Space Shuttle program

- Pierre J. Thuot (born 1955), U.S. Navy (3 flights)

STS-36 Atlantis — February/March 1990 — Mission Specialist — classified United States Department of Defense payload
STS-49 Endeavour — May 1992 — Mission Specialist — Maiden flight of Endeavour, Intelsat 603 capture and redeployment to a correct orbit, first and only (as of 2019) EVA involving three astronauts
STS-62 Columbia — March 1994 — Mission Specialist — operation of the U.S. Microgravity Payload-2 (USMP-2)

== See also ==
- List of astronauts by year of selection
