= Thomas Akers =

American astronaut (born 1951)

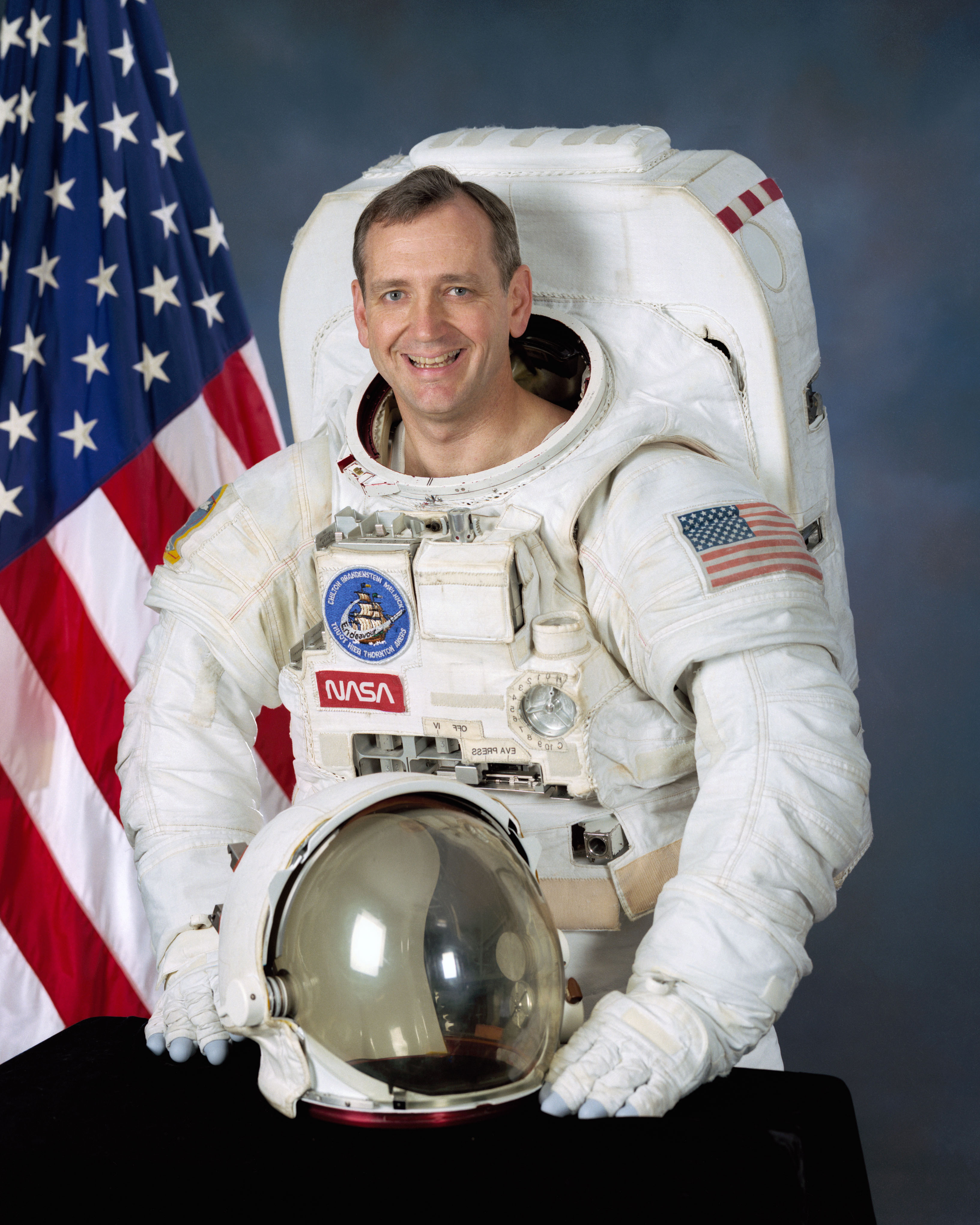
- Akers in 1992
- Born: Thomas Dale Akers; May 20, 1951 (age 75); St. Louis, Missouri, U.S.
- Education: Missouri University of Science and Technology (BS, MS)
- Space career

NASA astronaut
- Rank: Colonel, USAF
- Time in space: 33d 22h 44m
- Selection: NASA Group 12 (1987)
- Total EVAs: 4
- Total EVA time: 29h, 40m
- Mission: STS-41; STS-49; STS-61; STS-79

Thomas Dale Akers (born May 20, 1951) is a former American astronaut in NASA's Space Shuttle program.

== Education ==
Akers was the valedictorian of his 29-member 1969 senior class from Eminence, Missouri. He worked summers as a park ranger in the 80,000 acre federal wilderness that borders Eminence. He graduated from the University of Missouri-Rolla (now the Missouri University of Science and Technology) with B.S. and M.S. degrees in applied mathematics in 1973 and 1975, respectively. At the age of 24, he returned to Eminence to become its high school principal. In 1979, when a United States Air Force recruiter left brochures on his desk for his students, it was Akers who decided to sign up. While stationed at Eglin AFB, FL, Akers taught math and physics classes at Troy State University for a two years. He graduated from the USAF Test Pilot School as a flight test engineer in 1983 and has over 2,500 hours of back seat flight time in over 25 different aircraft. He was selected for the astronaut program in 1987 and officially became an astronaut in 1988.

== NASA career ==
Akers is a veteran of four shuttle flights in which he spent over 800 hours in orbit, including more than 29 hours of extra-vehicular activity (EVA) experience. In each of his flights, his role was as a mission specialist.

=== STS-41 ===
His first space flight was in 1990 on STS-41, the 11th flight of Space Shuttle Discovery. He was instrumental in deploying the European Space Agency satellite Ulysses, a solar-exploration craft, as well as tending several secondary payloads and experiments.

=== STS-49 ===
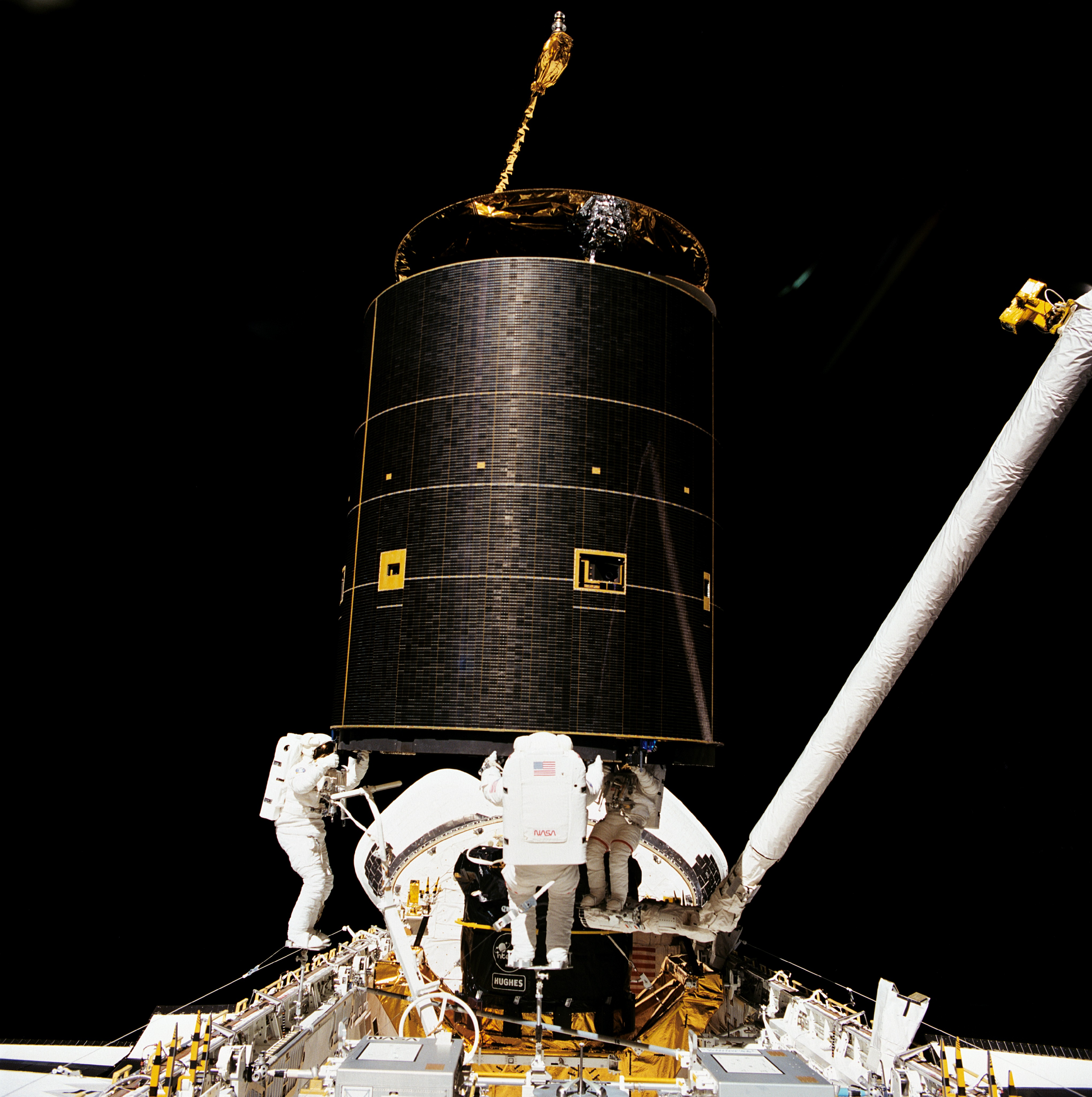
The STS-49 three-person EVA. Left to right: Richard Hieb, Akers, Pierre J. Thuot.

His next mission was in 1992 on STS-49, the maiden flight of Shuttle Endeavour. A primary goal of that mission was to capture and repair the non-functional Intelsat VI-F3 satellite. The first two attempts failed; Akers joined the third attempt which was successful. This markedthe first three-person EVA in human history and was also the longest EVA (8 hours, 29 minutes) ever conducted to that time. He then the next day, along with Kathryn Thornton, conducted the second longest EVA at the time, investigating space station construction techniques.

=== STS-61 ===
On Akers' third mission in 1993 on STS-61, the fifth flight of Endeavour, he was one of four mission specialists who repaired and upgraded the Hubble Space Telescope on its first servicing mission. Akers spent just under 13.5 hours outside the Endeavour in two EVAs again with space walking partner Kathryn Thornton.

In May 18, 1994, Akers appeared on Home Improvement as himself along with rest of the STS-61 crew.

=== STS-79 ===
His last mission was in 1996 on STS-79, the 17th flight of shuttle Atlantis. This was the fourth shuttle flight to rendezvous with the Russian space station Mir and the first to exchange U.S. astronauts with Mir, returning Shannon Lucid to earth and leaving John Blaha.

== After NASA ==
Akers retired from NASA in 1997 and the Air Force in 1999 with the rank of colonel, taking a position as instructor of Mathematics at the University of Missouri–Rolla, which in 2008 changed its name to the Missouri University of Science and Technology. Akers retired from teaching in 2010 in Emeritus status.

== Other work ==
Akers made a cameo appearance on the TV show Home Improvement by Touchstone Television. In Series 3, Episode 24, "Reality Bytes", Akers and the Hubble crew appeared as guests on Tool Time and showed some of the tools they used in space. They also brought a video showing the first Tim Taylor 'grunt' used in communications during a space walk.

== Special honors ==
High School Valedictorian. Graduated summa cum laude from University of Missouri-Rolla. Named a Distinguished Graduate of U.S. Air Force Officer Training School, Squadron Officer School, and U.S. Air Force Test Pilot School. Recipient of the Defense Superior Service Medal with two oak leaf clusters; Legion of Merit Award; Defense Meritorious Service Medal; Air Force Meritorious Service Medal; Air Force Commendation Medal; Air Force Achievement Medal; NASA Distinguished Service Medal; two NASA Exceptional Service Medals; four NASA Space Flight Medals. Awarded an honorary Doctorate of Engineering from the University of Missouri-Rolla in 1992. Awarded ten Outstanding Teacher awards from UMR/S&T 2000–2010, and the Missouri Governors Teaching Award 2004. Inducted into Astronaut Hall of Fame in May 2026.
