= Stephen D. Thorne =

American astronaut

Stephen Thorne
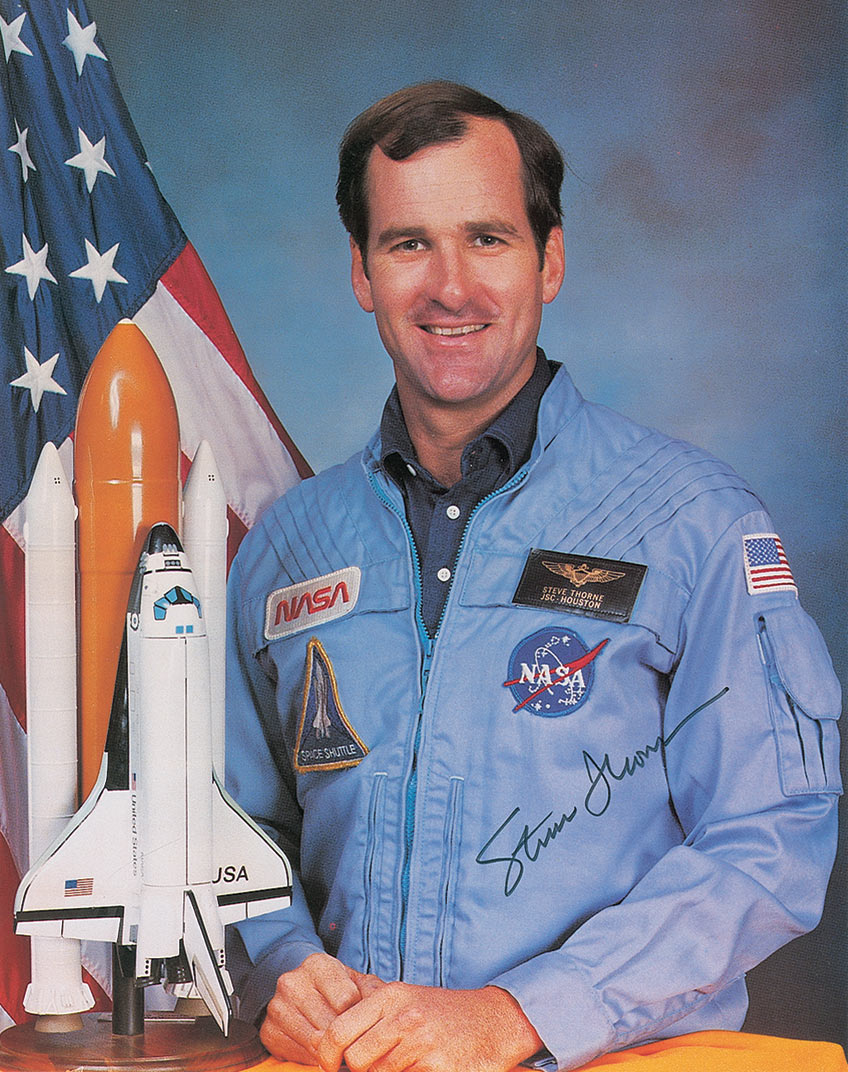
- Born: Stephen Douglas Thorne; February 11, 1953; Frankfurt, West Germany (now Germany
- Died: May 24, 1986 (aged 33); Santa Fe, Texas, U.S.
- Resting place: Arlington National Cemetery
- Education: United States Naval Academy (BS)
- Space career

NASA astronaut candidate
- Rank: Lieutenant Commander, USN
- Selection: NASA Group 11 (1985)

Stephen Douglas Thorne (February 11, 1953 – May 24, 1986), (Lt Cmdr, USN), was an American naval officer and aviator, test pilot and a NASA astronaut candidate.

He was born on February 11, 1953, in Frankfurt, West Germany, and graduated from the U.S. Naval Academy in 1975. He was a Navy fighter pilot from 1976 until he became a test pilot in 1981.

He was accepted for NASA astronaut training in June 1985, but died in an airplane accident where he was a passenger on May 24, 1986.

== Education ==
He graduated from T. L. Hanna High School, Anderson, South Carolina, in 1971 and received a Bachelor of Science degree in Systems Engineering from the United States Naval Academy in 1975.

== Naval career ==
Upon graduation from the U.S. Naval Academy, Thorne entered flight training and received his aviator wings in December 1976. Following training in the F-4 Phantom, he joined Fighter Squadron 21 (VF-21) and deployed to the Western Pacific aboard the USS Ranger. After training at the U.S. Naval Test Pilot School in 1981, Thorne spent the next two years at Strike Aircraft Test at the Naval Air Test Center, Patuxent River, Maryland, flying mostly ordnance and weapons systems tests in the F-4 and A-7 Corsair II. He completed F-18 Hornet transition training in October 1984 and joined Strike Fighter Squadron 132 (VFA-132) aboard USS Coral Sea until departing for NASA.

He accumulated over 2,500 flying hours and 200 carrier landings in approximately 30 different types of aircraft.

== Astronaut experience ==
Following an unsuccessful application for NASA Astronaut Group 10, Thorne was selected as an astronaut candidate by NASA in June 1985 and in August, commenced a one-year training and evaluation program to qualify him for subsequent assignment as a pilot on future Space Shuttle flights.

Thorne was killed in an aircraft accident of a stunt plane, in which he was a passenger, on May 24, 1986, two months before his astronaut class graduated. The stunt plane crashed while performing maneuvers near Santa Fe, Texas, killing Thorne and NASA engineer James Simons. He is buried at Arlington National Cemetery.

== Organizations ==
- Member of the Society of Experimental Test Pilots.
- Life member of the Naval Academy Alumni Association.

== Awards ==
Received Navy Commendation Medal in January 1986.

== Personal life ==
Thorne married Sue Lotz of Staunton, Virginia. His interests included baseball, running, and general aviation.
