= Pierre J. Thuot =

American astronaut (born 1955)

Pierre Thuot
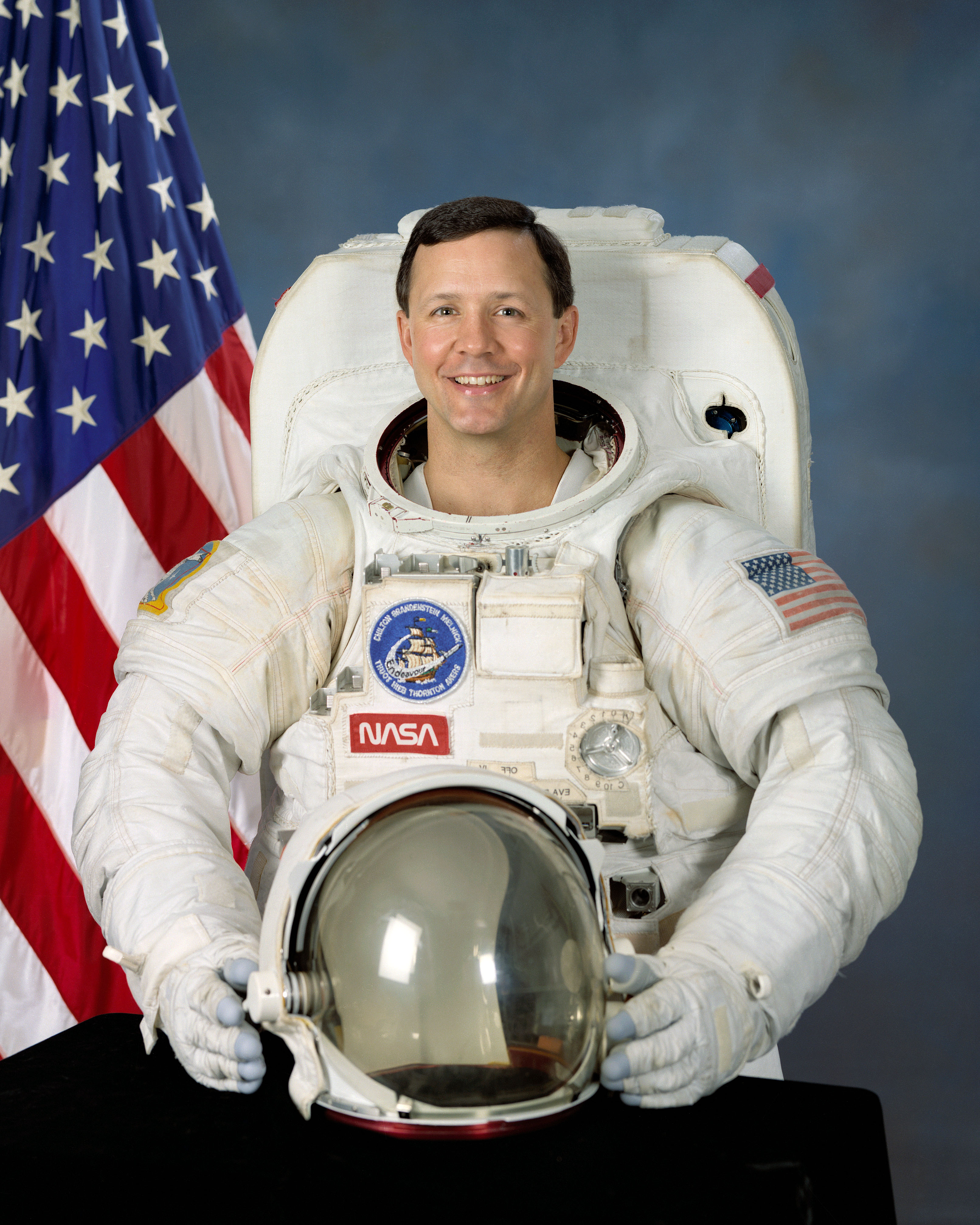
- Thuot in July 2010
- Born: Pierre Joseph Thuot; May 19, 1955 (age 71); Groton, Connecticut, U.S.
- Education: United States Naval Academy (BS); University of Southern California (MS)
- Space career

NASA astronaut
- Rank: Captain, USN
- Time in space: 27d 6h 51m
- Selection: NASA Group 11 (1985)
- Total EVAs: 3
- Total EVA time: 17h, 42m
- Missions: STS-36; STS-49; STS-62
- Mission insignia: STS-36 logo STS-49 logo STS-62 logo

Pierre Joseph Thuot (/ˈθuːət/; born May 19, 1955) is a retired United States Navy captain and NASA astronaut. He went into space three times, spending over 650 hours in space, including over 15 hours in three space walks. He is a former U.S. record holder for time spent on one spacewalk, and participated in the first three-person spacewalk.

== Early life and education ==
Born on May 19, 1955, in Groton, Connecticut, Thuot considers Fairfax, Virginia and New Bedford, Massachusetts to be his hometowns. Thuot graduated from Fairfax High School, Fairfax, Virginia, in 1973.

In 1977, he received a Bachelor of Science degree in physics from the United States Naval Academy. In 1985, he received a Master of Science degree in systems management from the University of Southern California. He attended Harvard Business School's six-week Advanced Management Program in 2004.

== Career ==
=== Flight experience ===
Thuot graduated 30th in his class from the U.S. Naval Academy in 1977 and commenced Naval Flight Officer training in July 1977. He received his wings in August 1978 and then reported to Fighter Squadron 101 (VF-101) at Naval Air Station Oceana, Virginia, for initial F-14 Tomcat training as a Radar Intercept Officer (RIO). He was then assigned to Fighter Squadron 14 (VF-14) and deployed to the Mediterranean and Caribbean Seas aboard the aircraft carriers USS John F. Kennedy and USS Independence. While assigned to VF-14, he attended the Navy Fighter Weapons School (TOPGUN). He was then selected to attend the U.S. Naval Test Pilot School in May 1982. Upon graduation in June 1983, he worked as a project test flight officer at the Naval Air Test Center flying the F-14A Tomcat, A-6E Intruder and the F-4J Phantom II until June 1984 when he returned to the U.S. Naval Test Pilot School as a flight instructor.

He has over 3,500 flight hours in more than 50 different aircraft, and has over 270 carrier landings.

=== NASA career ===
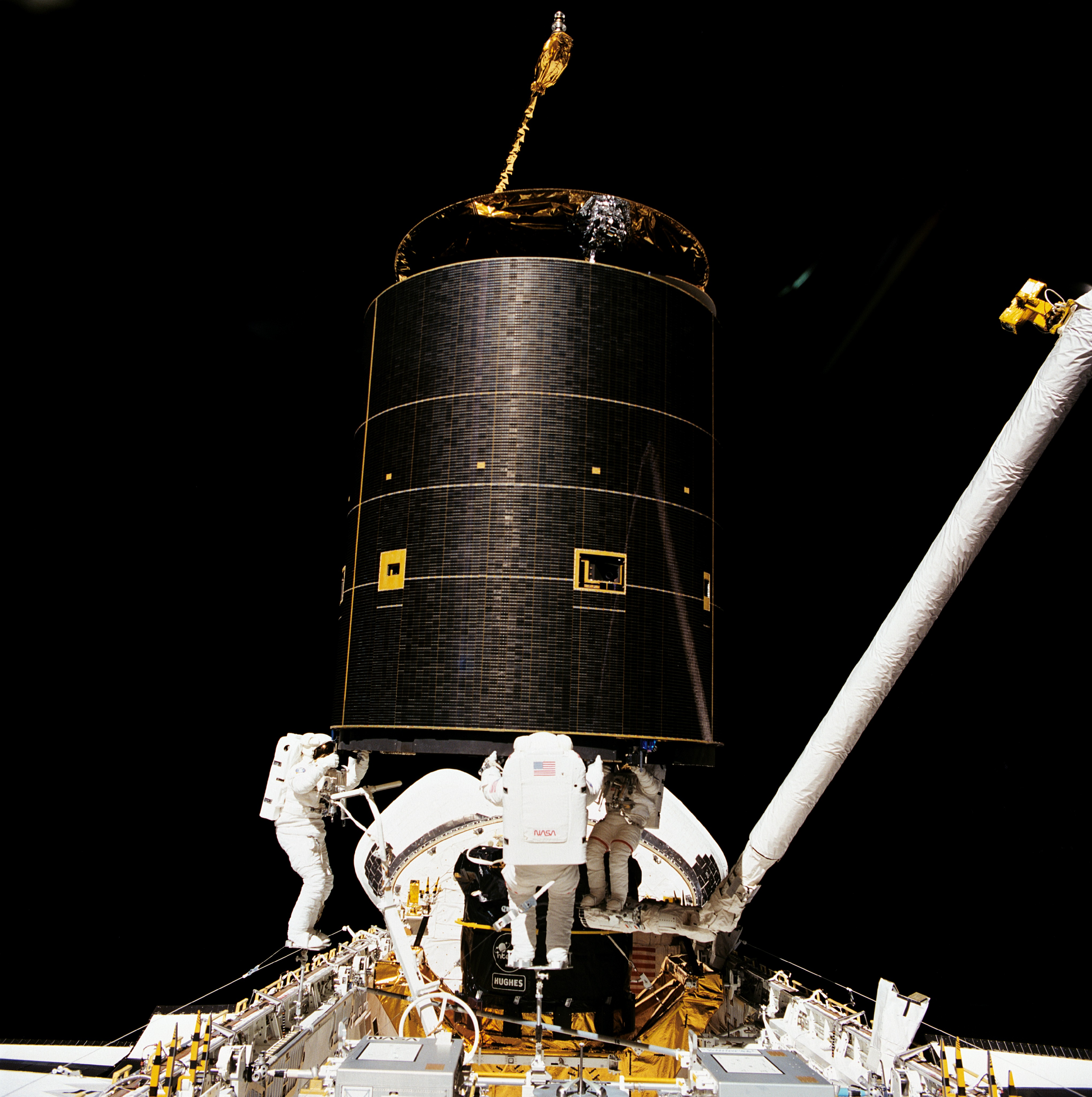
The STS-49 three-person EVA in 2000. Left to right: Richard Hieb, Thomas Akers, and Thuot.

Selected as an astronaut by NASA in June 1985, Thuot has served in a variety of technical assignments. As the remote manipulator system (robot arm), crew equipment, and extravehicular activity (EVA) representative for the Astronaut Office, he participated in the design, development and evaluation of Space Shuttle payloads, crew equipment and crew procedures. He performed Space Shuttle flight software verification in the Shuttle Avionics Integration Laboratory (SAIL) and served as a CAPCOM in the Mission Control Center, responsible for communications with the crew for numerous Space Shuttle missions. He served as the lead astronaut for Space Station integrated assembly and maintenance operations within the Astronaut Office. He served as Chief of the Astronaut Office Mission Support Branch, as well as supervising astronaut candidate training for the class of 1995. A veteran of three space flights, STS-36 in 1990, STS-49 in 1992 and STS-62 in 1994, Thuot has logged over 654 hours in space, including 17.7 hours on three space walks. Thuot was the first member of NASA Astronaut Group 11 to fly a shuttle mission.

On his first flight, Thuot was a mission specialist on the crew of STS-36 which was launched from the Kennedy Space Center, Florida, on February 28, 1990, aboard the Space Shuttle Atlantis. This mission carried Department of Defense payloads and a number of secondary payloads. Following 72 orbits of the Earth in 106 hours, the STS-36 mission concluded with a lakebed landing at Edwards Air Force Base, California, on March 4, 1990, after traveling 1.87 million miles.

Thuot was a mission specialist on the crew of STS-49, the maiden voyage of the Space Shuttle Endeavour, which was launched from the Kennedy Space Center on May 7, 1992. During that mission, Thuot, along with astronaut Richard Hieb, performed three spacewalks which resulted in the capture and repair of the stranded Intelsat VI F3 communications satellite. The third spacewalk, which also included astronaut Thomas Akers, was the first-ever three-person spacewalk. This 8 hour and 29 minute spacewalk, the longest in history, broke a twenty-year-old record that was held by the Apollo 17 astronauts. The mission concluded on May 16, 1992, with a landing at Edwards Air Force Base after orbiting the Earth 141 times in 213 hours and traveling 3.7 million miles.

On March 4, 1994, Thuot was launched aboard Space Shuttle Columbia on STS-62, a microgravity science and technology demonstration mission that carried the United States Microgravity Payload (USMP-2) and the Office of Aeronautics and Space Technology (OAST-2) payloads. More than sixty experiments or investigations were conducted in scientific and engineering disciplines including materials science, human physiology, biotechnology, protein crystal growth, robotics, structural dynamics, atmospheric ozone monitoring and spacecraft glow. During the spacecraft glow investigation, Columbia's orbital altitude was lowered to 105 nautical miles (194 km), the lowest ever flown by a Space Shuttle. STS-62, one of the longest Space Shuttle missions, concluded on March 18, 1994, with a landing at the Kennedy Space Center after orbiting the Earth 224 times in 13 days, 23 hours, and 16 minutes and traveling 5.8 million miles.

With the completion of his third mission, Thuot has logged over 654 hours in space, including over 17.7 hours on three spacewalks.

Thuot left NASA in June 1995 and returned to active service with the United States Navy.

== Post-Navy career ==
Thuot retired from the U.S. Navy in 1998 and took a job with Orbital Sciences Corporation as a vice president in the Dulles, Virginia-based firm's Space Systems Group. He is currently a Senior Systems Engineer at the Johns Hopkins University Applied Physics Laboratory.

== Professional membership ==
Thuot is a member of the U.S. Naval Academy Alumni Association, the Association of Naval Aviation, the University of Southern California Alumni Association, the Association of Space Explorers, the American Astronautical Society (AAS) and an Associate Fellow of the American Institute of Aeronautics and Astronautics (AIAA).

== Honors ==
He has been awarded three Defense Superior Service Medals, the Legion of Merit, the National Intelligence Medal of Achievement, the National Defense Service Medal, two Navy Meritorious Unit Commendations, two Navy Battle Efficiency Awards, the Sea Service Deployment Ribbon, the AAS Flight Achievement Award and Victor A. Prather Award for 1993, three NASA Space Flight Medals, two NASA Exceptional Service Medals, and seven NASA Group Achievement Awards. He held the U.S. and absolute world records for total time spent on space walks: 8 hours and 29 minutes from 1992 until 2001.

== Personal life ==
Thuot is married to the former Cheryl Ann Mattingly of Leonardtown, Maryland, and they have two children. Thuot enjoys boating, golf, running, music, flying and family activities.
