= Intelsat 603 =

Geostationary communications satellite

Coordinates: 0°N 120.07°W

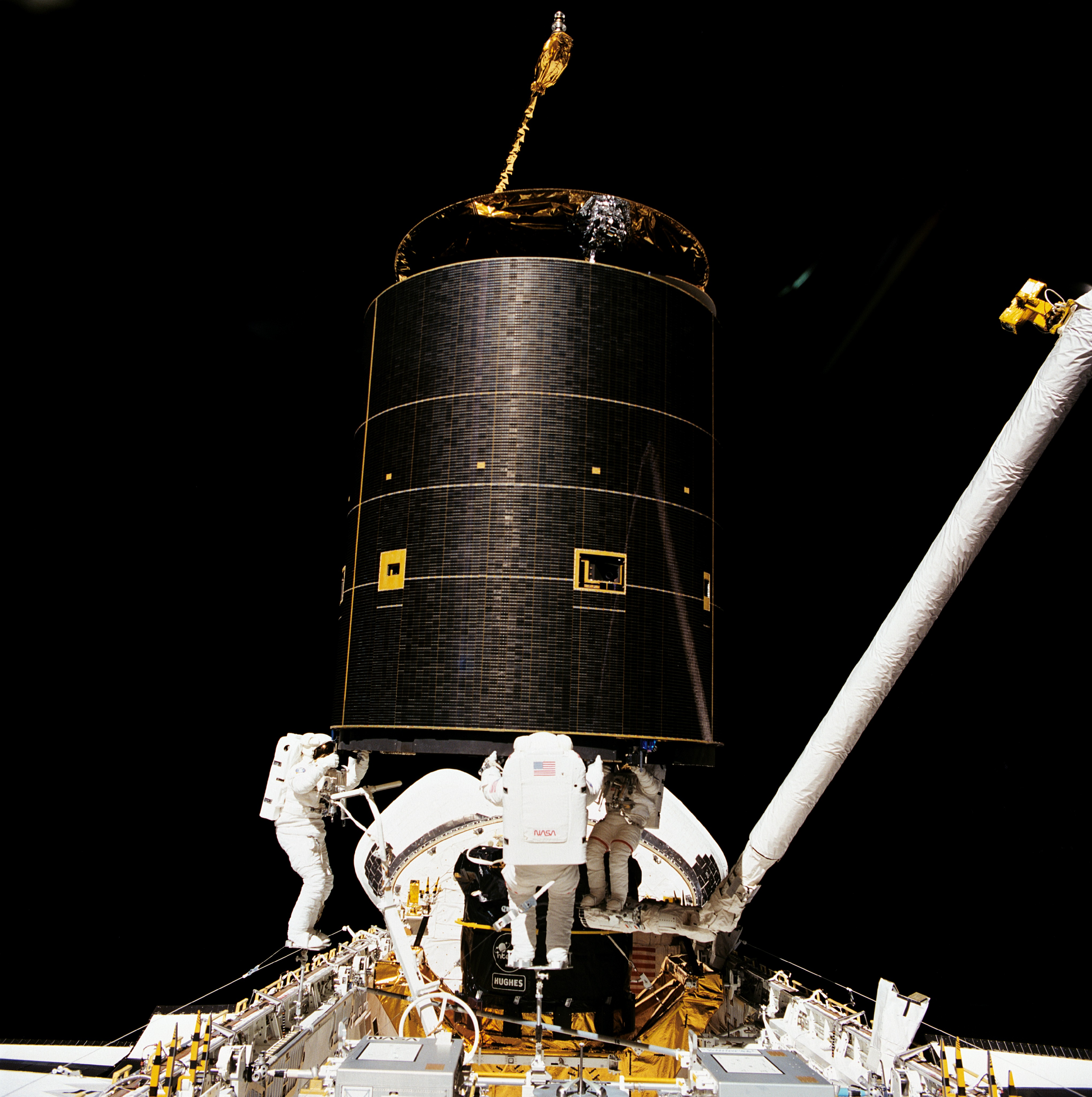
- Astronauts working on Intelsat 603 during STS-49
- Mission type: Communication
- Operator: Intelsat
- COSPAR ID: 1990-021A
- SATCAT no.: 20523
- Mission duration: 13 years (planned); 23 years (achieved)

Spacecraft properties
- Bus: HS-389
- Manufacturer: Hughes
- Launch mass: 4,215 kilograms (9,292 lb)

Start of mission
- Launch date: 14 March 1990, 11:52:31 UTC
- Rocket: CT-III/Orbus-21S CT-2
- Launch site: Cape Canaveral LC-40
- Contractor: Martin Marietta

End of mission
- Disposal: Decommissioned
- Deactivated: January 2013

Orbital parameters
- Reference system: Geocentric
- Regime: Geostationary
- Perigee altitude: 35,776 kilometres (22,230 mi)
- Apogee altitude: 35,797 kilometres (22,243 mi)
- Inclination: 0.3 degrees
- Period: 1436.09 minutes
- Epoch: 10 September 1990

Intelsat 603 or IS-603, previously named Intelsat VI F-3, is a communications satellite operated by Intelsat. Launched in 1990, it was the second of five Intelsat VI satellites to be launched. The Intelsat VI series was constructed by Hughes Aircraft, based on the HS-389 satellite bus.

== Launch ==
Intelsat 603 was launched at 11:52:31 UTC on 14 March 1990, atop a Commercial Titan III carrier rocket, flight number CT-2, with an Orbus-21S upper stage. The launch took place from Launch Complex 40 at the Cape Canaveral Air Force Station, and was intended to place Intelsat 603 into a geosynchronous transfer orbit. The Orbus-21S failed to separate from the Titan's second stage, and as a result it was unable to fire, leaving Intelsat 603 in low Earth orbit.

Following the launch failure, Intelsat commissioned NASA to launch a replacement perigee motor to raise the satellite's orbit. During its maiden flight, STS-49, in 1992 Space Shuttle Endeavour rendezvoused with and captured Intelsat 603, and astronauts attached a new Orbus-21S to the satellite. This motor successfully raised the satellite into the planned transfer orbit.

The satellite raised itself into its final geostationary orbit using two liquid-fuelled R-4D-12 engines, with the satellite arriving in geostationary orbit on 21 May 1992.

== Operations ==
Intelsat 603 operated in a geostationary orbit with a perigee of 35,776 kilometres (22,230 mi), an apogee of 35,797 kilometres (22,243 mi), and 0.3 degrees of inclination. The satellite carried 38 IEEE C band and ten IEEE K_{u} band transponders, and had a design life of 13 years and a mass of 4,215 kilograms (9,292 lb).

Upon arrival in geostationary orbit, Intelsat 603 was placed at a longitude of 34.5 degrees west. It remained there until October 1997, when it was moved to 24.5 degrees west, arriving in November. In August 2002 it was relocated to 19.95 degrees west, where it operated until March 2010. Finally from May 2010 it operated at 11.5 degrees east until it was removed from geostationary orbit in January 2013.

Intelsat confirmed in February 2015 that Intelsat 603 had been retired to a graveyard orbit.
