= Richard Hieb =

American astronaut (born 1955)

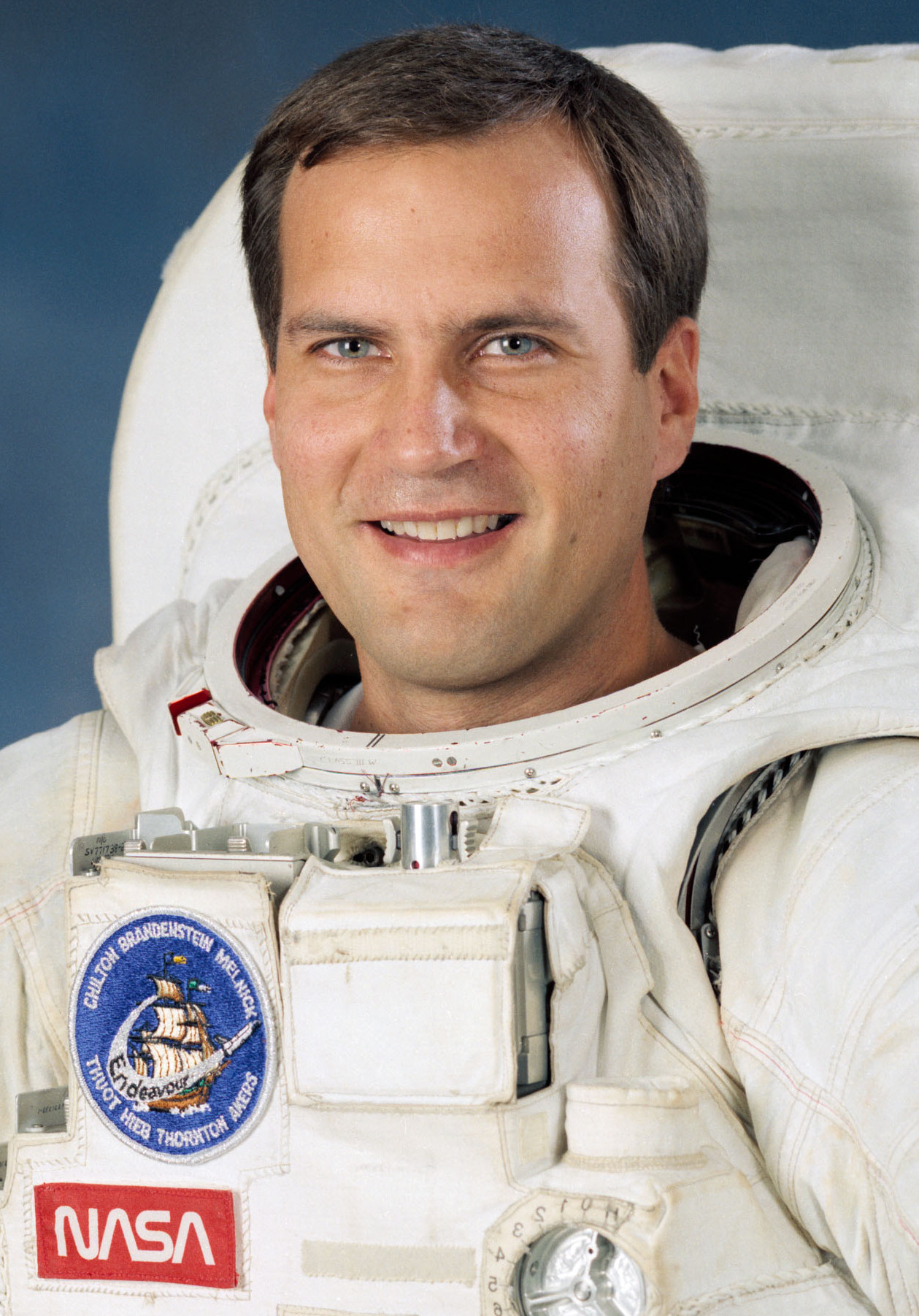
- NASA portrait, 1992
- Born: Richard James Hieb; September 21, 1955 (age 71); Jamestown, North Dakota, U.S.
- Education: Northwest Nazarene University (BS); University of Colorado, Boulder (MS)
- Space career

NASA astronaut
- Time in space: 31d 22h 34m
- Selection: NASA Group 11 (1985)
- Total EVAs: 3
- Total EVA time: 17h, 42m
- Missions: STS-39; STS-49; STS-65

Richard James Hieb (born September 21, 1955, in Jamestown, North Dakota) is a former NASA astronaut and a veteran of three Space Shuttle missions. He was a mission specialist on STS-39 and STS-49, and was a payload commander on STS-65. After leaving NASA he worked at AlliedSignal and Orbital before spending 14 years as an executive at Lockheed Martin. He is currently a faculty member in the University of Colorado Boulder Smead Aerospace Engineering Sciences Department.

== Early life and education ==
Hieb's family originates from many places in Europe, and includes one line that came to the Americas in the 1600s. The name Hieb is of German origin. His mother was a long time elementary school teacher at Lincoln Elementary in Jamestown, North Dakota and his father was a transport driver before retiring and operating a small business buying and selling antiques and specialty items where he was a well-known figure at sales around eastern North Dakota.

Hieb received a Bachelor of Arts degree in math and physics from Northwest Nazarene College in 1977. He went on to graduate from the University of Colorado at Boulder in 1979 with a Master of Science degree in aerospace engineering.

== NASA career ==
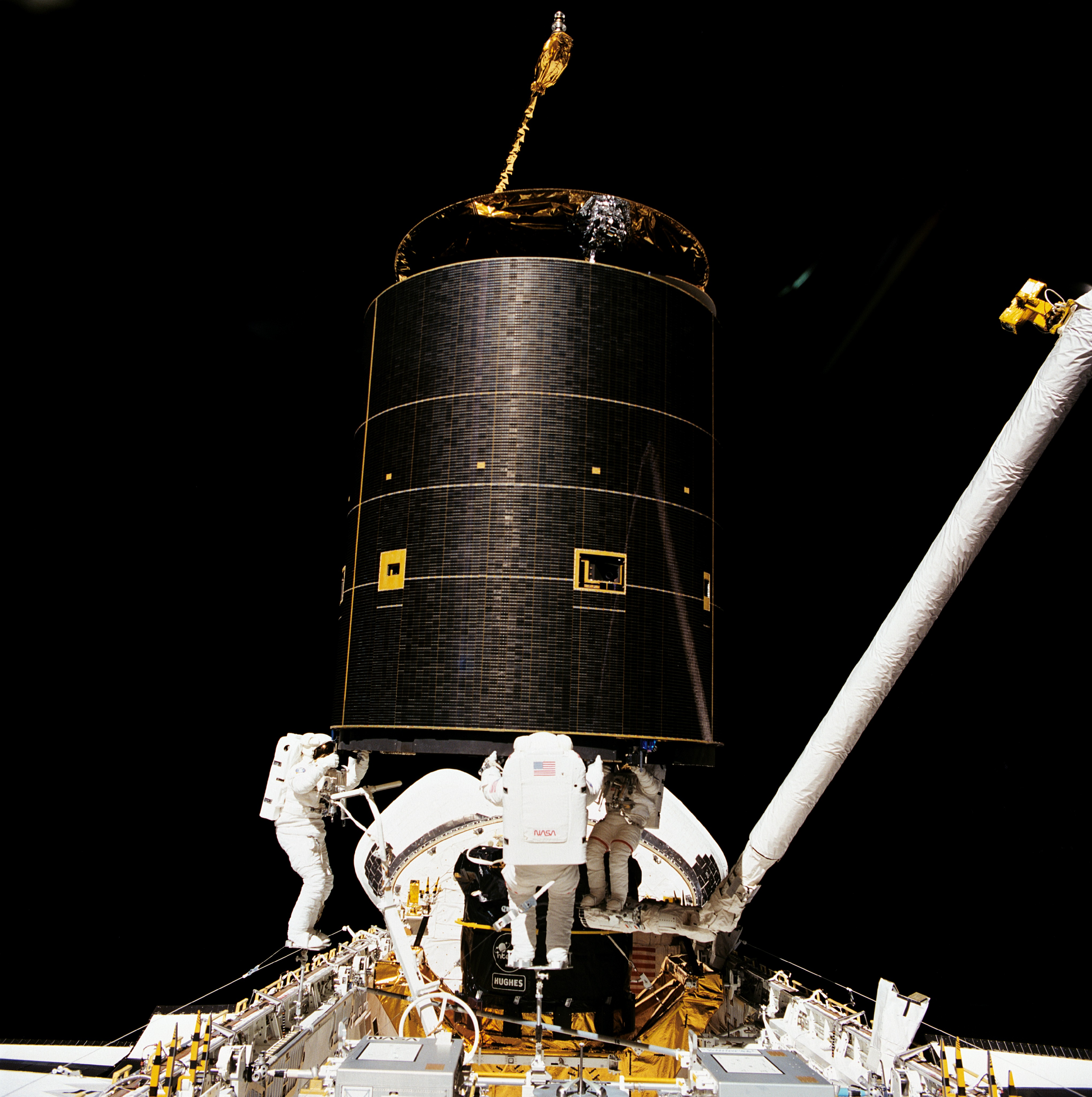
The STS-49 three-person EVA. Left to right: Hieb, Thomas Akers, Pierre J. Thuot.

Upon graduation from CU/Boulder, Hieb went to NASA/JSC to work in crew procedures development and crew activity planning. He worked in the Mission Control Center on the ascent team for STS-1, and during rendezvous phases on numerous subsequent flights. He has an extensive background in on-orbit procedures development, particularly in rendezvous and proximity operations. Selected by NASA as an astronaut candidate in June 1985, Hieb qualified July 1986 for assignment as a mission specialist on future Space Shuttle flight crews. A veteran of three space flights, Hieb flew on STS-39 in 1991, STS-49 in 1992, and STS-65 in 1994. He logged over 750 hours in space, including over 17 hours of EVA (spacewalk), traveling over 13 million miles.

Hieb first flew on the crew of STS-39, an unclassified Department of Defense mission which launched on April 28, 1991, from the Kennedy Space Center in Florida. During the mission, he was responsible for operating the Infrared Background Signature Satellite from within the payload bay, on the Remote Manipulator System and as a free-flying satellite. He also operated the remote system to release the satellite, and then to retrieve the satellite a day and a half later. After 134 orbits of the Earth which covered 3.5 million miles (5,600,000 km) and lasted just over 199 hours, the crew landed at California, on May 6, 1991.

Hieb was also a mission specialist on the crew of STS-49, the maiden voyage of the new Space Shuttle Endeavour, which launched from the Kennedy Space Center on May 7, 1992. During that mission, Hieb along with astronaut Pierre Thuot, performed three spacewalks which resulted in the capture and repair of the stranded Intelsat VI F3 communications satellite. The third spacewalk, which also included astronaut Tom Akers, was the first ever (and to date only) three-person spacewalk. This 8 hour and 29 minute spacewalk, the longest in history, broke a twenty-year-old record that was held by Apollo 17 astronauts. The STS-49 record endured for 9 years until being surpassed by James Voss and Susan Helms on the International Space Station, and now stands in second place for EVA duration. The mission concluded on May 16, 1992, with a landing at Edwards Air Force Base after orbiting the Earth 141 times in 213 hours and traveling 3.7 million miles (5.9 million kilometres).

Hieb was the payload commander on the second flight of the International Microgravity Laboratory on Space Shuttle Mission STS-65. The mission launched from Kennedy Space Center in Florida on July 8, 1994, and returned there on July 23, 1994, setting a new flight duration record for the Space Shuttle program. During the 15-day flight the crew conducted more than 80 experiments focusing on materials and life sciences research in microgravity. The mission was accomplished in 236 orbits of the Earth, traveling 6.1 million miles (9.8 million kilometres).
