= STS-49 =

1992 American crewed spaceflight to Intelsat 603 and maiden flight of Shuttle Endeavour

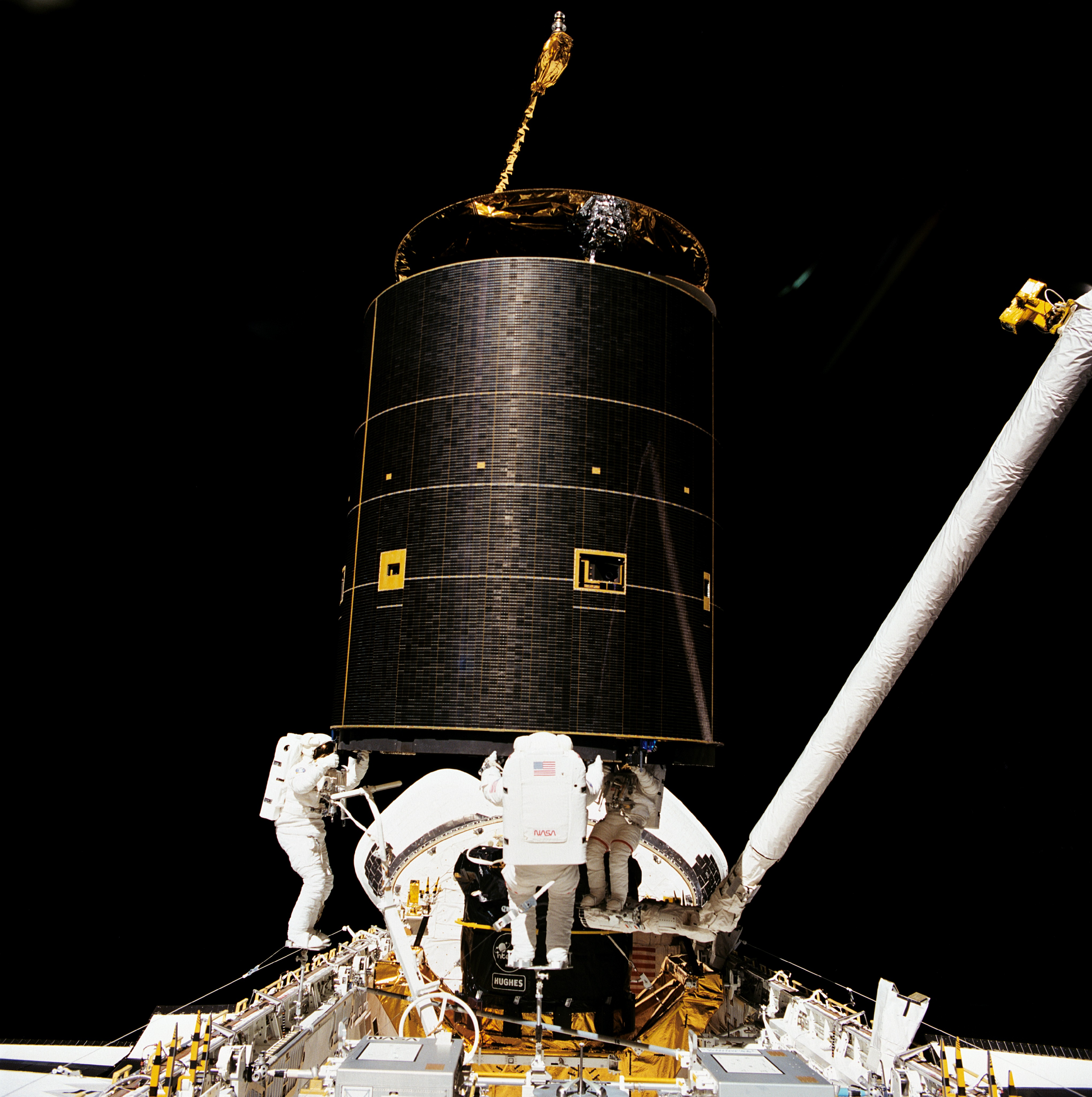
- Hieb, Akers, and Thuot assist in capturing the Intelsat 603 satellite from its derelict orbit.
- Names: Space Transportation System-49
- Mission type: Intelsat 603 satellite repair
- Operator: NASA
- COSPAR ID: 1992-026A
- SATCAT no.: 21963
- Mission duration: 8 days, 21 hours, 17 minutes, 39 seconds
- Distance travelled: 5,948,166 km (3,696,019 mi)
- Orbits completed: 141

Spacecraft properties
- Spacecraft: Space Shuttle Endeavour
- Launch mass: 116,390 kg (256,600 lb)
- Landing mass: 91,279 kg (201,236 lb)
- Payload mass: 16,984 kg (37,443 lb)

Crew
- Crew size: 7
- Members: Daniel Brandenstein; Kevin P. Chilton; Richard Hieb; Bruce E. Melnick; Pierre J. Thuot; Kathryn C. Thornton; Thomas Akers
- EVAs: 4
- EVA duration: 22 hours, 27 minutes; 1st EVA: 3 hours, 43 minutes; 2nd EVA: 5 hours, 30 minutes; 3rd EVA: 8 hours, 29 minutes; 4th EVA: 7 hours, 45 minutes

Start of mission
- Launch date: May 7, 1992, 23:40:00 UTC (7:40 pm EDT)
- Launch site: Kennedy, LC-39B
- Contractor: Rockwell International

End of mission
- Landing date: May 16, 1992, 20:57:39 UTC (1:57:39 pm PDT)
- Landing site: Edwards, Runway 22

Orbital parameters
- Reference system: Geocentric orbit
- Regime: Low Earth orbit
- Perigee altitude: 268 km (167 mi)
- Apogee altitude: 341 km (212 mi)
- Inclination: 28.32°
- Period: 90.60 minutes

Instruments
- Air Force Maui Optical Station (AMOS); Commercial Protein Crystal Growth (CPCG); Ultraviolet Plume Imager (UVPI)
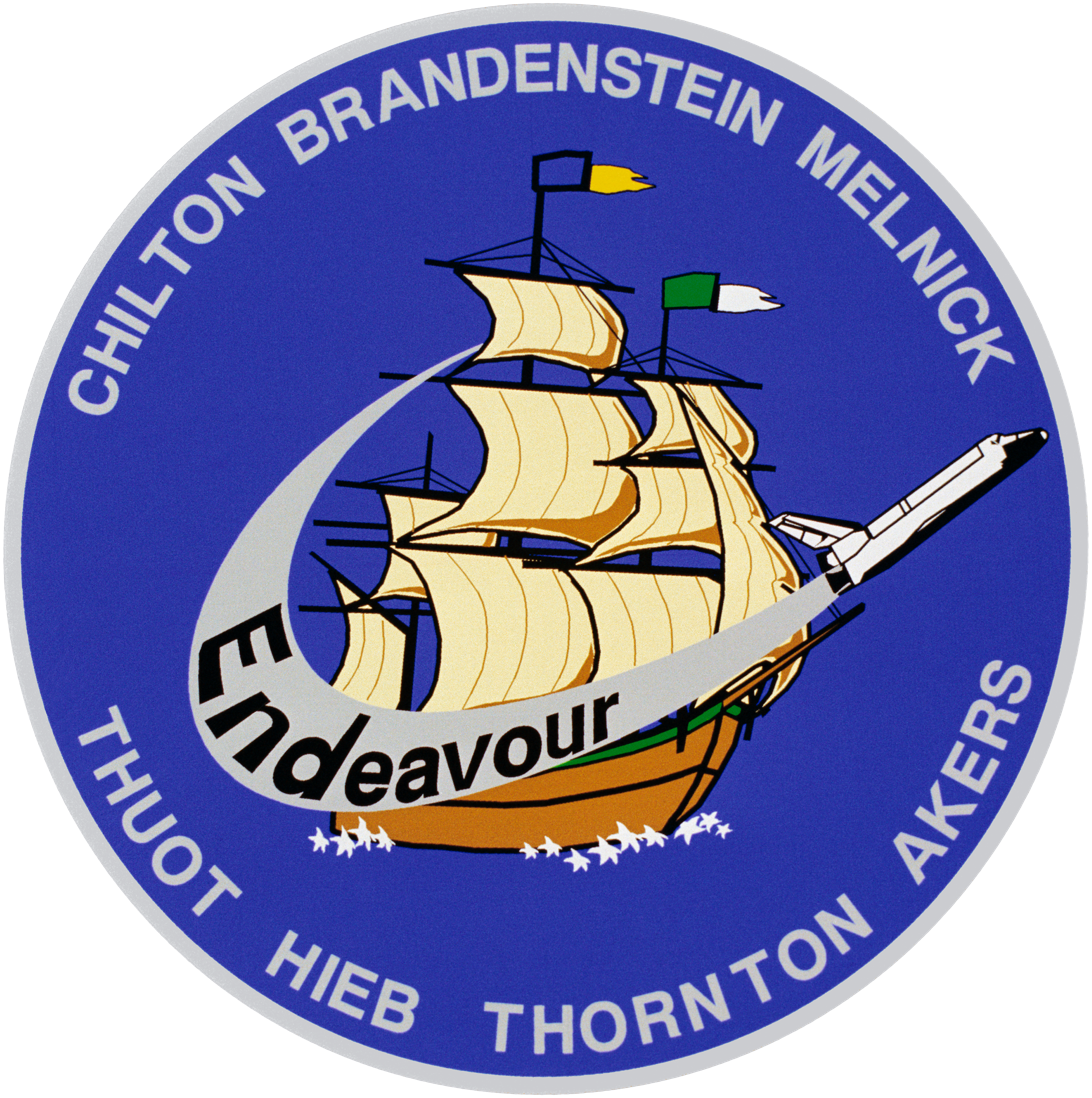
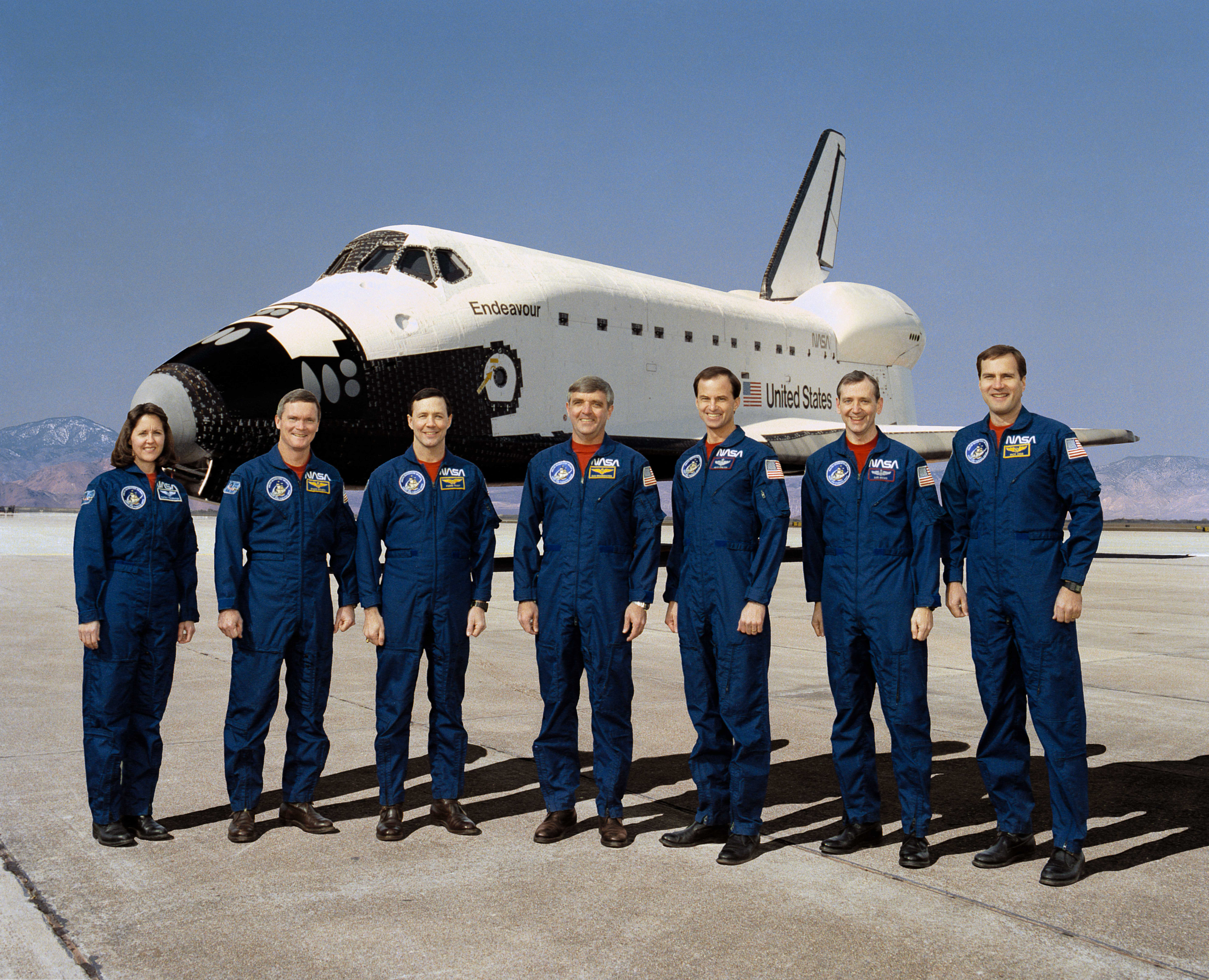
- STS-49 mission patch From left: Thornton, Melnick, Thuot, Brandenstein, Chilton, Akers and Hieb Space Shuttle program

STS-49 was NASA's maiden flight of the Space Shuttle Endeavour, which launched on May 7, 1992. The primary goal of its nine-day mission was to retrieve an Intelsat VI satellite, Intelsat 603, which failed to leave Low Earth orbit two years before, attach it to a new upper stage, and relaunch it to its intended geosynchronous orbit. After several attempts, the capture was completed with the only three-person extravehicular activity (EVA) in space flight history. It would also stand until STS-102 in 2001 as the longest EVA ever undertaken.

== Crew ==
Position	Astronaut
Commander	Daniel Brandenstein; Fourth and last spaceflight
Pilot	Kevin P. Chilton; First spaceflight
Mission Specialist 1	Richard Hieb; Second spaceflight
Mission Specialist 2 Flight Engineer	Bruce E. Melnick; Second and last spaceflight
Mission Specialist 3	Pierre J. Thuot; Second spaceflight
Mission Specialist 4	Kathryn C. Thornton; Second spaceflight
Mission Specialist 5	Thomas Akers; Second spaceflight

=== Spacewalks ===
EVA 1

- Personnel: Thuot and Hieb
- Date: May 10–11, 1992 (20:40–00:23 UTC)
- Duration: 3 hours, 43 minutes

EVA 2

- Personnel: Thuot and Hieb
- Date: May 11–12, 1992 (21:05–02:35 UTC)
- Duration: 5 hours, 30 minutes

EVA 3

- Personnel: Thuot, Hieb and Akers
- Date: May 13–14, 1992 (21:17–05:46 UTC)
- Duration: 8 hours, 29 minutes

EVA 4

- Personnel: Thornton and Akers
- Date: May 14–15, 1992 (≈21:00–05:00 UTC)
- Duration: 7 hours, 45 minutes

=== Crew seat assignments ===
Seat	Launch	Landing	Seats 1–4 are on the flight deck. Seats 5–7 are on the mid-deck.
1	Brandenstein		Seats 1–4 are on the flight deck. Seats 5–7 are on the mid-deck.
2	Chilton		Seats 1–4 are on the flight deck. Seats 5–7 are on the mid-deck.
3	Hieb	Thuot	Seats 1–4 are on the flight deck. Seats 5–7 are on the mid-deck.
4	Melnick		Seats 1–4 are on the flight deck. Seats 5–7 are on the mid-deck.
5	Thuot	Hieb	Seats 1–4 are on the flight deck. Seats 5–7 are on the mid-deck.
6	Thornton		Seats 1–4 are on the flight deck. Seats 5–7 are on the mid-deck.
7	Akers		Seats 1–4 are on the flight deck. Seats 5–7 are on the mid-deck.

== Mission highlights ==
The Intelsat 603 satellite, stranded in an unusable orbit since launch aboard a Commercial Titan III launch vehicle in March 1990, was captured by crewmembers during an extravehicular activity (EVA) and equipped with a new perigee kick motor. The satellite was subsequently released into orbit and the new motor fired to put the spacecraft into a geosynchronous orbit for operational use.

The capture required three EVAs: a planned one by astronauts Thuot and Hieb, who were unable to attach a capture bar to the satellite from a position on the RMS (Canadarm); a second unscheduled but identical attempt the following day; and finally, an unscheduled but successful hand capture by Thuot, Hieb and Akers as commander Brandenstein delicately maneuvered the orbiter to within a few feet of the 4,215 kg (9,292 lb) communications satellite. An Assembly of Station by EVA Methods (ASEM) structure was erected in the cargo bay by the crew to serve as a platform to aid in the hand capture and subsequent attachment of the capture bar. A planned EVA also was performed by astronauts Thornton and Akers as part of the ASEM experiment to demonstrate and verify maintenance and assembly capabilities for Space Station Freedom. The ASEM space walk, originally scheduled for two successive days, was cut to one day because of the lengthy Intelsat retrieval operation.

Other "payloads of opportunity" experiments conducted included Commercial Protein Crystal Growth (CPCG), Ultraviolet Plume Imager (UVPI) and the Air Force Maui Optical Station (AMOS) investigation. The mission was extended by two days to complete all the mission objectives.

On flight day 7, the Ku-band antenna lost its pointing capability. It had to be stowed manually during the final EVA.

The following records were set during the STS-49 mission:

- First flight of the Space Shuttle Endeavour
- First (and only) EVA involving three astronauts.
- Second and fourth longest EVAs to date: 8 hours, 29 minutes, and 7 hours, 45 minutes. (Longest EVA to date was during STS-102 in 2001: 8 hours 56 minutes; third longest EVA was during STS-61 in 1993: 7 hour 54 minutes)
- First Shuttle mission to feature four EVAs.
- The second longest EVA time for a single Shuttle mission: 25 hours and 27 minutes, or 59:23 person hours. (The longest is STS-61 with 35 hours and 28 minutes)
- First Shuttle mission requiring three rendezvous with an orbiting spacecraft.
- First use of a drag chute during a Shuttle landing.

== Wake-up calls ==
NASA began a tradition of playing music to astronauts during the Project Gemini, and first used music to wake up a flight crew during Apollo 15. A special musical track is chosen for each day in space, often by the astronauts' families, to have a special meaning to an individual member of the crew, or in reference to the day's planned activities.

Day	Song	Artist/Composer	Played For
Day 2	"God Bless the U.S.A."	Lee Greenwood	
Day 3	"Rescue Me"	Fontella Bass	
Day 4	"Theme from Winnie the Pooh"		Kathy Thornton (from her Children on Mother's Day)
Day 5	"Gonna Fly Now (Theme from Rocky)"	Bill Conti	
Day 6	"Kokomo"	The Beach Boys	
Day 7	No song		
Day 8	"I wake up with a smile on my face"	Boxcar Willie	
Day 9	"Son of a Son of a Sailor"	Jimmy Buffett	

== Gallery ==
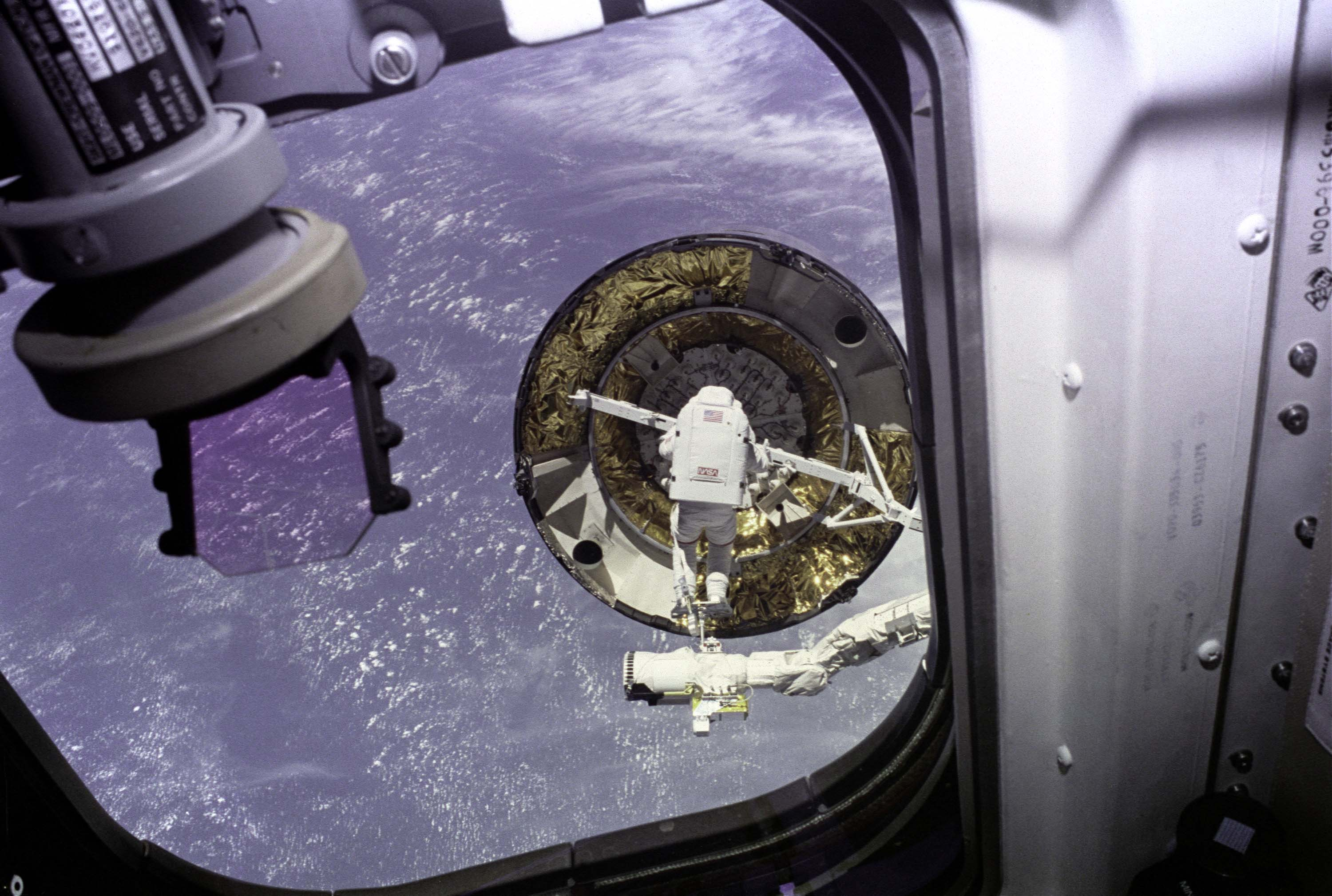
Thuot during one of the capture attempts

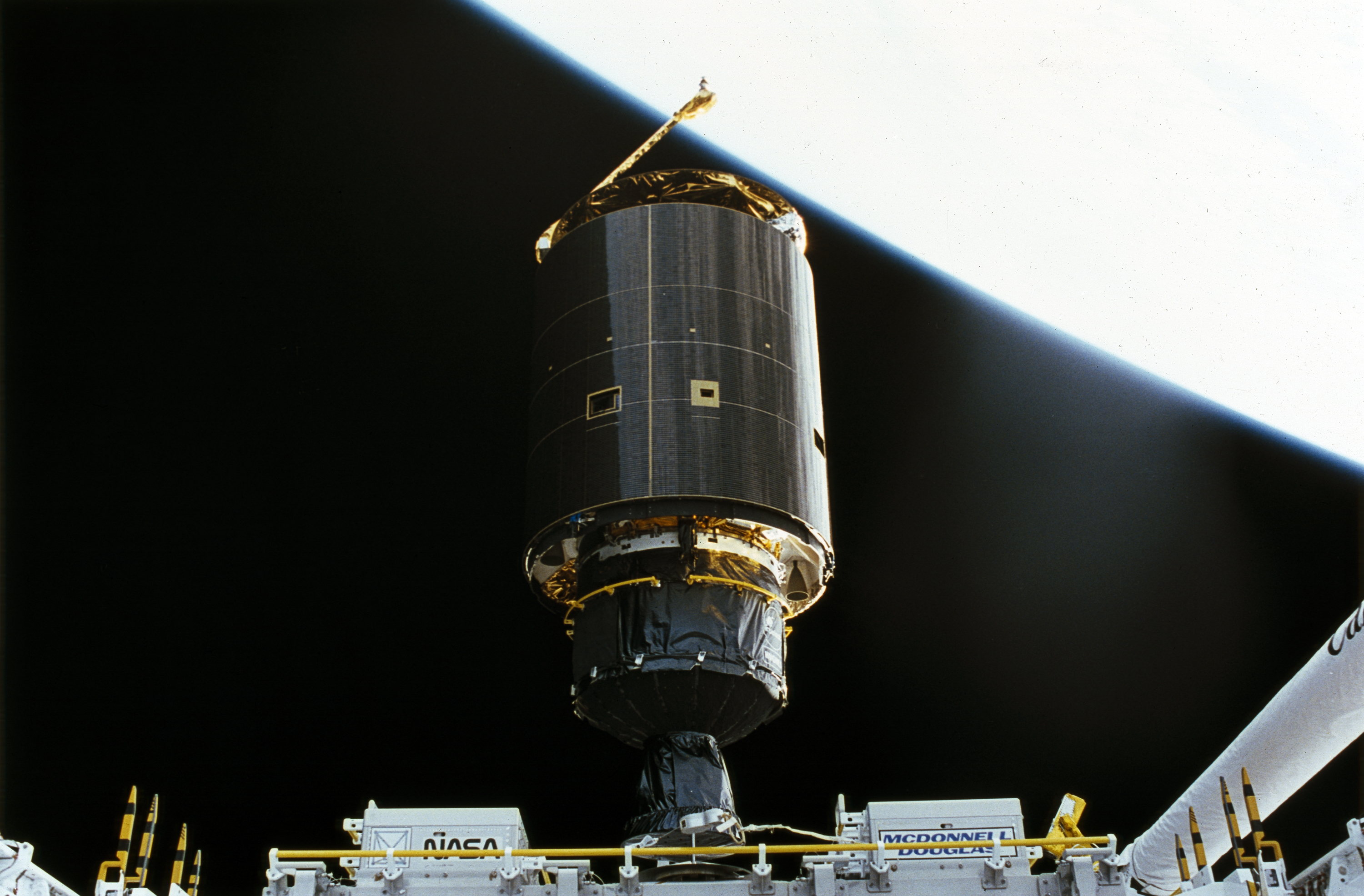
Re-deployment of Intelsat 603

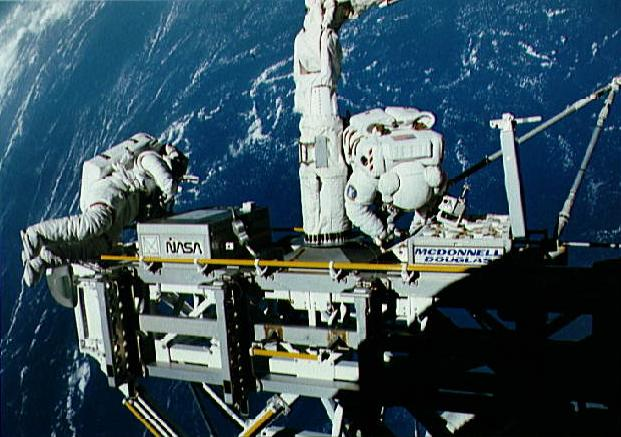
ASEM is manipulated by the Canadarm; Thornton and Akers during EVA 4.

== See also ==
- List of human spaceflights
- List of Space Shuttle missions
- Nikon NASA F4
- Outline of space science
- Space Shuttle
