= Intelsat VI =

Series of satellites

The Intelsat VI series of satellites were the 8th generation of geostationary communications satellites for the Intelsat Corporation. Designed and built by Hughes Aircraft Company (HAC) in 1983-1991, there were five VI-series satellites built: 601, 602, 603, 604, and 605.

== Design ==
The Intelsat VI satellite was designed as a spinning satellite as had previous satellite designs. The main body of the spacecraft was spun at 30 revolutions per minute (rpm) to impart gyroscopic stability to the satellite in the Earth's gravitation field. A section of the spacecraft supporting the communications payload and antenna was de-spun to allow the antenna to point at the desired location on the earth.

The Intelsat VI series combined two design features of previous HAC satellites, larger solar array and wide body design. The HS376 extended power spinner satellite had an extra concentric cylindrical solar array which deployed after launch to increase the power generating capability of the satellite, and allow for a larger communications payload. The U.S Government's Wide-body Spacecraft was a larger diameter satellite designed to be launched by the Space Transportation System (STS, US Space Shuttle). Thus the Intelsat VI satellite were of a wide body spinning design with a larger solar array, due to the deploy-able array. The later HS393 series of satellites also used the wide body and extended solar array design.

This resulted in a spacecraft that was 3.6 meters (11 ft 10 in) in diameter and approximately 5.2 m (17 ft 1 in) tall as configured for launch on an Ariane 4 rocket. When the spacecraft had arrived at its assigned orbital location, the concentric solar array would be extended (deployed), along with deployment of the communications antenna. The spacecraft would then be 11.7 m (38 ft 5 in) in length.

The Intelsat VI series of satellite were designed to be launched by either Ariane 4 rockets or the U.S. Space Shuttle.

=== Propulsion ===
A liquid bi-propellant propulsion subsystem was used on the Intelsat VI series satellites, and used nitrogen tetroxide and mono-methyl hydrazine. Four radial thrusters, rated at 22 newtons (N) (5 lbf) are used for east-west station-keeping, and spin-up/spin-down control. Two 22 N axial mounted thrusters provide north-south station-keeping and attitude control. Two 490 N (110 lbf) apogee thrusters were used to provide the apogee boost to the satellite and support re-orientation maneuvers.

=== Power subsystem ===
The solar array on the Intelsat VI was sized to provide about 2600 watts of power at the beginning of the satellites life. The Intelsat VI satellites used nickel hydrogen pressure vessel batteries to support operation when the spacecraft was in eclipse behind the earth.

As noted in the introduction, the Intelsat VI series of satellites were designed with a cylindrical spacecraft body which was covered by photovoltaic (PV) solar cells. Since the satellite was rotating at 30 rpm, a flat panel solar array on a side of the spacecraft would be exposed to the sun intermittently and not generate continuous power. With a cylindrical array part of the solar array would always be in sunlight and would generate power for the spacecraft to operate.

=== Communications payload ===
The communications payload basically consists of the receivers, filters, amplifiers and interconnection cables or waveguide used to receive radio signals from earth transmitters, and convert them to suitable downlink frequencies, and retransmit the signals back to the earth.

The Intelsat VI satellite used C band at 6 GHz for the uplink/4 GHz for the downlink, and Ku-band at 14 GHz uplink/11 GHz downlink, and had 50 communications transponders which were designed to carry 33,000 telephone circuits, the equivalent of 33,000 two way telephone calls, as well as four television channels. The Intelsat VI satellites used a RF switching network to allow static connections between the uplink channels and downlink channels. The satellite also used a time division multiple access (TDMA) dynamic microwave switching network on channels 1-2 and 3-4 to allow the dynamic cross connection of the channels for TDMA type signals.

=== Antennas ===
The antenna system and coverages were designed to be identical for all of the Intelsat VI satellites. This provided simplicity of design and manufacturing for the five satellites in the series, since all the antenna components could be made identical for each of the five satellites. It also allows for any of the VI series satellites to replace another satellite in case of an on-orbit failure.

A 2.0 m diameter reflector antenna was used for receiving C-band signals transmitted up from the earth. The satellite had two C-band "hemi" beam coverages which were designed to cover the landmass areas as seen from any of the orbital locations. Four beams were designed to provide smaller zone coverage for specific areas of the earth depending on the orbital location. Both the "hemi" and zone beams used an antenna reflector 3.2 m (10 ft 6 in) in diameter with a 4.2 m (13 ft 9 in) focal length. A 149 element feed horn array and four switching networks (three were switchable in orbit) allowed the zone coverage to be changed to match the orbital location.

The satellite had a C-band global coverage horn, which provided coverage of the entire earth, for receive and transmission of two channels or repeaters.

The satellite also had two Ku-band steerable spot beams which could be moved to cover any specific area on the earth, and could be re-pointed as needed. The Ku-band spot beams provide both receive and transmit capability.

=== TC&R ===
The telemetry, tracking and control (TT&C), or telemetry, command and ranging (TC&R) subsystem is used to receive spacecraft control commands sent from ground control stations, send telemetry from the satellite subsystems to ground receivers, and support tracking and ranging of the satellite by ground stations.

The Intelsat VI satellites used C-band for the TC&R subsystem, and a pair of omni-directional antennas were mounted on a deploy-able boom.

== Launch ==
=== Via Ariane 4 ===
When launched by the Ariane 4 the satellite would be mounted to a SPELDA adapter (a satellite payload carrier system), which is mounted on the top of the Ariane 4 rocket. A protective shroud or fairing covers the satellite and upper stage and protects it from aerodynamic forces (high speed air flow) during launch. The fairing is jettisoned when the rocket has reached the upper atmosphere and the aerodynamic forces are no longer significant. When the upper stage has finished firing and is coasting, the upper stage (and satellite) was spun up to 5 rpm prior to release of the satellite. This provides initial stability for the satellite after release from the rocket upper stage. The Ariane 4 put the Intelsat VI satellites directly into a transfer orbit. Ground commands would fire the apogee engines for circularizing of the initial orbit and stabilization at the desired geostationary orbital location. Ground commands would then also be used to command the satellite to spin up to its normal spin rate.

=== Via U.S. Space Shuttle ===
When launched by the U.S. Space Shuttle a solid propellant perigee stage (motor and carrier) would be attached to the bottom of the spacecraft. This carrier was used to mount the satellite into a cradle in the Space Shuttle cargo bay. The satellite was ejected from the space shuttle "Frisbee-style" which imparted a stabilizing spin to the satellite. The satellite was allowed to drift a safe distance from the space shuttle before the perigee motor was fired. The perigee motor provided energy (velocity) to the satellite to raise the apogee of the satellite's orbit; it is named for the location in the orbit at which it is used. The perigee motor was jettisoned after it was used. The liquid fuel apogee engines of the Intelsat VI satellites were then used to boost the perigee of the satellite and provide orbit circularization through apogee burns.

=== On station ===
Upon arrival on station (assigned geostationary orbital location) and after correct orientation, the payload (and antenna) section of the satellite would be de-spun and pointed at the desired location on the earth, the solar array would be deployed, and the communications antenna would be deployed.

== Intelsat 603 ==
Intelsat 603 was launched by a Commercial Titan III on 14 March 1990. The separation of the upper (second) stage from the satellite failed. This left the satellite and the upper stage attached to each other, and Intelsat was unable to fire the perigee motor to boost the satellite to its higher orbit. Intelsat flight controllers jettisoned the perigee motor which detached the satellite from the Titan upper stage. However without the perigee motor the satellite could not be boosted to its nominal geostationary orbit. The on-board propulsion system was used to move the satellite into a slightly higher stable orbit.

Intelsat arranged for a rescue of 603 by the US Space Shuttle. STS-49 was launched on May 7, 1992, 7:40 p.m. EDT. Three of the shuttle astronauts successfully captured the satellite by hand on May 14, 1992, after several failed attempts using a capture bar. After being secured in the shuttle cargo bay, a new perigee kick motor was installed. Intelsat 603 was released from the shuttle and the perigee kick motor was successfully ignited and 603 was placed into the proper geostationary orbit.

== Intelsat VI Model ==
A 1/2 scale model is on display in the main lobby of the Intelsat Headquarters building, which is located at 3400 International Drive NW, Washington DC 20008. There are other Intelsat satellites models displayed, along with models of several rockets that have been used to launch Intelsat satellites.
