= List of Space Shuttle crews =

This is a list of persons who served aboard Space Shuttles, arranged in chronological order by Space Shuttle missions.

Abbreviations:

- PC = Payload Commander
- MSE = USAF Manned Spaceflight Engineer
- Mir = Launched to be part of the crew of the Mir Space Station
- ISS = Launched to be part of the crew of the International Space Station.

Names of astronauts returning from the Mir or ISS on the Space Shuttle are shown in italics. They did not have specific crew roles, but are listed in the Payload Specialist columns for reasons of space.

Only two flights have carried more than seven crew members for either launch or landing. STS-61-A in 1985 is the only flight to have both launched and landed with a crew of eight, and STS-71 in 1995 is the only other flight to have landed with a crew of eight.

== 1977 ==
| Order | Day | Year | Mission | Shuttle | Duration | Commander | Pilot |
Captive-active flights***
| N/A | June 18 | 1977 | ALT-9 | Enterprise | N/A | Haise | Fullerton |
| N/A | June 28 | 1977 | ALT-10 | Enterprise | N/A | Engle | Truly |
| N/A | July 26 | 1977 | ALT-11 | Enterprise | N/A | Haise | Fullerton |
Free flights
| (1) | August 12 | 1977 | ALT-12 | Enterprise | 5 min 21 s | Haise | Fullerton |
| (2) | September 13 | 1977 | ALT-13 | Enterprise | 5 min 28 s | Engle | Truly |
| (3) | September 23 | 1977 | ALT-14 | Enterprise | 5 min 34 s | Haise | Fullerton |
| (4) | October 12 | 1977 | ALT-15 | Enterprise | 2 min 34 s | Engle | Truly |
| (5) | October 26 | 1977 | ALT-16 | Enterprise | 2 min 1 s | Haise | Fullerton |

* Note 1: In this year, Approach and Landing Tests (ALT) were accomplished. These were atmospheric only, non-spaceflight tests from a Boeing 747 Shuttle Carrier Aircraft, both with the orbiter attached and for a series of drop-test flights.

** Note 2: The durations listed count only the orbiter free-flight time, and not total time aloft along with airborne time atop of the 747 SCA.

*** Note 3: Flights with the orbiter attached to the SCA for the duration, but both crewed and powered to test crew procedures and orbiter systems.

== 1981–1985 ==
| Order | Day | Year | Mission | Shuttle | Duration | Commander | Pilot | Mission specialists | | | Payload specialists | | |
|---|---|---|---|---|---|---|---|---|---|---|---|---|---|
| 1 | April 12 | 1981 | STS-1 | Columbia | 2 d 6 h | Young | Crippen | | | | | | |
| 2 | November 12 | 1981 | STS-2 | Columbia | 2 d 6 h | Engle | Truly | | | | | | |
| 3 | March 22 | 1982 | STS-3 | Columbia | 8 d 0 h | Lousma | Fullerton | | | | | | |
| 4 | June 27 | 1982 | STS-4 | Columbia | 7 d 1 h | Mattingly | Hartsfield | | | | | | |
| 5 | November 11 | 1982 | STS-5 | Columbia | 5 d 2 h | Brand | Overmyer | J. Allen | Lenoir | | | | |
| 6 | April 4 | 1983 | STS-6 | Challenger | 5 d 0 h | Weitz | Bobko | Peterson | Musgrave | | | | |
| 7 | June 18 | 1983 | STS-7 | Challenger | 6 d 2 h | Crippen | Hauck | Fabian | Ride | Thagard | | | |
| 8 | August 30 | 1983 | STS-8 | Challenger | 6 d 1 h | Truly | Brandenstein | D. Gardner | Bluford | W. Thornton | | | |
| 9 | November 28 | 1983 | STS-9 | Columbia | 10 d 7 h | Young | Shaw | Garriott | Parker | | Merbold | Lichtenberg | |
| 10 | February 3 | 1984 | STS-41-B | Challenger | 7 d 23 h | Brand | Gibson | McCandless | McNair | Stewart | | | |
| 11 | April 6 | 1984 | STS-41-C | Challenger | 6 d 23 h | Crippen | Scobee | G. Nelson | van Hoften | Hart | | | |
| 12 | August 30 | 1984 | STS-41-D | Discovery | 6 d 0 h | Hartsfield | Coats | Mullane | Hawley | Resnik | C. Walker | | |
| 13 | October 5 | 1984 | STS-41-G | Challenger | 8 d 5 h | Crippen | McBride | Sullivan | Ride | Leestma | Garneau | Scully-Power | |
| 14 | November 8 | 1984 | STS-51-A | Discovery | 7 d 23 h | Hauck | D. Walker | A. Fisher | D. Gardner | J. Allen | | | |
| 15 | January 24 | 1985 | STS-51-C | Discovery | 3 d 1 h | Mattingly | Shriver | Onizuka | Buchli | | Payton MSE | | |
| 16 | April 12 | 1985 | STS-51-D | Discovery | 6 d 23 h | Bobko | D. E. Williams | Seddon | Griggs | Hoffman | C. Walker | Garn | |
| 17 | April 29 | 1985 | STS-51-B | Challenger | 7 d 0 h | Overmyer | Gregory | Lind | Thagard | W. Thornton | van den Berg | Wang | |
| 18 | June 17 | 1985 | STS-51-G | Discovery | 7 d 1 h | Brandenstein | Creighton | Lucid | Fabian | Nagel | Baudry | Al Saud | |
| 19 | July 29 | 1985 | STS-51-F | Challenger | 7 d 22 h | Fullerton | Bridges | Musgrave | England | Henize | Acton | Bartoe | |
| 20 | August 27 | 1985 | STS-51-I | Discovery | 7 d 2 h | Engle | Covey | van Hoften | Lounge | W. Fisher | | | |
| 21 | October 3 | 1985 | STS-51-J | Atlantis | 4 d 1 h | Bobko | Grabe | Hilmers | Stewart | | Pailes MSE | | |
| 22 | October 30 | 1985 | STS-61-A | Challenger | 7 d 0 h | Hartsfield | Nagel | Dunbar | Buchli | Bluford | Furrer | Messerschmid | Ockels |
| 23 | November 26 | 1985 | STS-61-B | Atlantis | 6 d 21 h | Shaw | O'Connor | Ross | Cleave | Spring | Neri | C. Walker | |

== 1986–1990 ==
| Order | Day | Year | Mission | Shuttle | Duration | Commander | Pilot | Mission specialists | | | Payload specialists | |
|---|---|---|---|---|---|---|---|---|---|---|---|---|
| 24 | January 12 | 1986 | STS-61-C | Columbia | 6 d 2 h | Gibson | Bolden | Chang-Diaz | Hawley | G. Nelson | Cenker | B. Nelson |
| 25 | January 28 | 1986 | STS-51-L | Challenger | 1 min 13 s (Note: Mission was intended to have a duration for 6d 34m.) | Scobee | M. Smith | Onizuka | Resnik | McNair | McAuliffe | Jarvis |
| 26 | September 29 | 1988 | STS-26 | Discovery | 4 d 1 h | Hauck | Covey | Lounge | G. Nelson | Hilmers | | |
| 27 | December 2 | 1988 | STS-27 | Atlantis | 4 d 9 h | Gibson | G. Gardner | Mullane | Ross | Shepherd | | |
| 28 | March 13 | 1989 | STS-29 | Discovery | 4 d 23 h | Coats | Blaha | Bagian | Buchli | Springer | | |
| 29 | May 4 | 1989 | STS-30 | Atlantis | 4 d 0 h | D. Walker | Grabe | Thagard | Cleave | Lee | | |
| 30 | August 8 | 1989 | STS-28 | Columbia | 5 d 1 h | Shaw | R. Richards | Adamson | Leestma | M. Brown | | |
| 31 | October 18 | 1989 | STS-34 | Atlantis | 4 d 23 h | D. E. Williams | McCulley | Chang-Diaz | Lucid | E. Baker | | |
| 32 | November 22 | 1989 | STS-33 | Discovery | 5 d 0 h | Gregory | Blaha | Musgrave | Carter | K. Thornton | | |
| 33 | January 9 | 1990 | STS-32 | Columbia | 10 d 21 h | Brandenstein | Wetherbee | Dunbar | Low | Ivins | | |
| 34 | February 28 | 1990 | STS-36 | Atlantis | 4 d 10 h | Creighton | Casper | Mullane | Hilmers | Thuot | | |
| 35 | April 24 | 1990 | STS-31 | Discovery | 5 d 1 h | Shriver | Bolden | Hawley | McCandless | Sullivan | | |
| 36 | October 6 | 1990 | STS-41 | Discovery | 4 d 2 h | R. Richards | Cabana | Shepherd | Melnick | Akers | | |
| 37 | November 15 | 1990 | STS-38 | Atlantis | 4 d 21 h | Covey | Culbertson | Springer | Meade | Gemar | | |
| 38 | December 2 | 1990 | STS-35 | Columbia | 8 d 23 h | Brand | G. Gardner | Hoffman | Lounge | Parker | Durrance | Parise |

== 1991–1995 ==
| Order | Day | Year | Mission | Shuttle | Duration | Commander | Pilot | Mission specialists | | | | | Payload specialists | | |
|---|---|---|---|---|---|---|---|---|---|---|---|---|---|---|---|
| 39 | April 5 | 1991 | STS-37 | Atlantis | 5 d 23 h | Nagel | Cameron | Ross | Apt | Godwin | | | | | |
| 40 | April 28 | 1991 | STS-39 | Discovery | 8 d 7 h | Coats | Hammond | Bluford | Harbaugh | Hieb | McMonagle | Veach | | | |
| 41 | June 5 | 1991 | STS-40 | Columbia | 9 d 2 h | O'Connor | Gutierrez | Bagian | Jernigan | Seddon | | | Gaffney | Hughes-Fulford | |
| 42 | August 2 | 1991 | STS-43 | Atlantis | 8 d 21 h | Blaha | M. Baker | Lucid | Adamson | Low | | | | | |
| 43 | September 12 | 1991 | STS-48 | Discovery | 5 d 8 h | Creighton | Reightler | Buchli | Gemar | M. Brown | | | | | |
| 44 | November 24 | 1991 | STS-44 | Atlantis | 6 d 22 h | Gregory | Henricks | Musgrave | Runco | J. S. Voss | | | Hennen | | |
| 45 | January 22 | 1992 | STS-42 | Discovery | 8 d 1 h | Grabe | Oswald | Thagard | Hilmers | Readdy | | | Bondar | Merbold | |
| 46 | March 24 | 1992 | STS-45 | Atlantis | 8 d 22 h | Bolden | Duffy | Sullivan PC | Leestma | Foale | | | Lichtenberg | Frimout | |
| 47 | May 7 | 1992 | STS-49 | Endeavour | 8 d 21 h | Brandenstein | Chilton | Thuot | Thornton | Hieb | Akers | Melnick | | | |
| 48 | June 25 | 1992 | STS-50 | Columbia | 13 d 19 h | R. Richards | Bowersox | Dunbar PC | E. Baker | Meade | | | DeLucas | Trinh | |
| 49 | July 31 | 1992 | STS-46 | Atlantis | 7 d 23 h | Shriver | A. Allen | Hoffman | Chang-Diaz | Nicollier | Ivins | | | Malerba | |
| 50 | September 12 | 1992 | STS-47 | Endeavour | 7 d 22 h | Gibson | C. Brown | Lee PC | Davis | Apt | Jemison | | | Mohri | |
| 51 | October 22 | 1992 | STS-52 | Columbia | 9 d 20 h | Wetherbee | M. Baker | Veach | Shepherd | Jernigan | | | MacLean | | |
| 52 | December 2 | 1992 | STS-53 | Discovery | 7 d 7 h | D. Walker | Cabana | Bluford | J. S. Voss | Clifford | | | | | |
| 53 | January 13 | 1993 | STS-54 | Endeavour | 5 d 23 h | Casper | McMonagle | Runco | Harbaugh | Helms | | | | | |
| 54 | April 8 | 1993 | STS-56 | Discovery | 9 d 6 h | Cameron | Oswald | Foale | Cockrell | Ochoa | | | | | |
| 55 | April 26 | 1993 | STS-55 | Columbia | 9 d 23 h | Nagel | Henricks | Ross | Precourt | Harris | | | Walter | Schlegel | |
| 56 | June 21 | 1993 | STS-57 | Endeavour | 9 d 23 h | Grabe | Duffy | Low PC | Sherlock | Wisoff | J. E. Voss | | | | |
| 57 | September 12 | 1993 | STS-51 | Discovery | 9 d 20 h | Culbertson | Readdy | Newman | Bursch | Walz | | | | | |
| 58 | October 18 | 1993 | STS-58 | Columbia | 14 d 0 h | Blaha | Searfoss | Seddon PC | W. McArthur | Wolf | Lucid | | Fettman | | |
| 59 | December 2 | 1993 | STS-61 | Endeavour | 10 d 19 h | Covey | Bowersox | Musgrave PC | Thornton | Nicollier | Hoffman | Akers | | | |
| 60 | February 3 | 1994 | STS-60 | Discovery | 7 d 6 h | Bolden | Reightler | Davis | Sega | Chang-Diaz | Krikalev | | | | |
| 61 | March 4 | 1994 | STS-62 | Columbia | 13 d 23 h | Casper | A. Allen | Thuot | Gemar | Ivins | | | | | |
| 62 | April 9 | 1994 | STS-59 | Endeavour | 11 d 5 h | Gutierrez | Chilton | Godwin PC | Apt | Clifford | Jones | | | | |
| 63 | July 8 | 1994 | STS-65 | Columbia | 14 d 17 h | Cabana | Halsell | Hieb PC | Walz | Chiao | D. Thomas | | Mukai | | |
| 64 | September 9 | 1994 | STS-64 | Discovery | 10 d 22 h | R. Richards | Hammond | Linenger | Helms | Meade | Lee | | | | |
| 65 | September 30 | 1994 | STS-68 | Endeavour | 11 d 5 h | M. Baker | Wilcutt | Jones PC | S. Smith | Bursch | Wisoff | | | | |
| 66 | November 3 | 1994 | STS-66 | Atlantis | 10 d 22 h | McMonagle | C. Brown | Ochoa PC | Parazynski | Tanner | Clervoy | | | | |
| 67 | February 3 | 1995 | STS-63 | Discovery | 8 d 6 h | Wetherbee | Collins | Foale | J. E. Voss | Harris | Titov | | | | |
| 68 | March 2 | 1995 | STS-67 | Endeavour | 16 d 15 h | Oswald | W. Gregory | Jernigan PC | Grunsfeld | Lawrence | | | Parise | Durrance | |
| 69 | June 27 | 1995 | STS-71 | Atlantis | 9 d 19 h | Gibson | Precourt | E. Baker | Dunbar | Harbaugh | Solovyev Mir | Budarin Mir | Thagard | Dezhurov | Strekalov |
| 70 | July 13 | 1995 | STS-70 | Discovery | 8 d 22 h | Henricks | Kregel | Currie | D. Thomas | Weber | | | | | |
| 71 | September 7 | 1995 | STS-69 | Endeavour | 10 d 20 h | D. Walker | Cockrell | J. S. Voss PC | Newman | Gernhardt | | | | | |
| 72 | October 20 | 1995 | STS-73 | Columbia | 15 d 21 h | Bowersox | Rominger | Thornton PC | Coleman | Lopez-Alegria | | | Leslie | Sacco | |
| 73 | November 12 | 1995 | STS-74 | Atlantis | 8 d 4 h | Cameron | Halsell | Ross | W. McArthur | Hadfield | | | | | |

== 1996–2000 ==
| Order | Day | Year | Mission | Shuttle | Duration | Commander | Pilot | Mission specialists | | | | | Payload specialists | |
|---|---|---|---|---|---|---|---|---|---|---|---|---|---|---|
| 74 | January 11 | 1996 | STS-72 | Endeavour | 8 d 22 h | Duffy | Jett | Chiao | Barry | Scott | Wakata | | | |
| 75 | February 22 | 1996 | STS-75 | Columbia | 15 d 17 h | A. Allen | Horowitz | Hoffman | Cheli | Nicollier | Chang-Diaz | | Guidoni | |
| 76 | March 22 | 1996 | STS-76 | Atlantis | 9 d 5 h | Chilton | Searfoss | Godwin | Clifford | Sega | Lucid Mir | | | |
| 77 | May 19 | 1996 | STS-77 | Endeavour | 10 d 0 h | Casper | C. Brown | Bursch | Runco | Garneau | A. Thomas | | | |
| 78 | June 20 | 1996 | STS-78 | Columbia | 16 d 21 h | Henricks | Kregel | Helms | Linnehan | Brady | | | Favier | Thirsk |
| 79 | September 16 | 1996 | STS-79 | Atlantis | 10 d 3 h | Readdy | Wilcutt | Akers | Apt | Walz | Blaha Mir | | Lucid | |
| 80 | November 19 | 1996 | STS-80 | Columbia | 17 d 15 h | Cockrell | Rominger | Jernigan | Jones | Musgrave | | | | |
| 81 | January 12 | 1997 | STS-81 | Atlantis | 10 d 4 h | M. Baker | Jett | Grunsfeld | Ivins | Wisoff | Linenger Mir | | Blaha | |
| 82 | February 11 | 1997 | STS-82 | Discovery | 9 d 23 h | Bowersox | Horowitz | Lee | Hawley | Harbaugh | S. Smith | Tanner | | |
| 83 | April 4 | 1997 | STS-83 | Columbia | 3 d 23 h | Halsell | Still | J. E. Voss | D. Thomas | Gernhardt | | | Crouch | Linteris |
| 84 | May 15 | 1997 | STS-84 | Atlantis | 9 d 5 h | Precourt | Collins | Noriega | Lu | Clervoy | Kondakova | Foale Mir | Linenger | |
| 85 | July 1 | 1997 | STS-94 | Columbia | 15 d 16 h | Halsell | Still | J. E. Voss | D. Thomas | Gernhardt | | | Crouch | Linteris |
| 86 | August 7 | 1997 | STS-85 | Discovery | 11 d 20 h | C. Brown | Rominger | Davis | Robinson | Curbeam | | | Tryggvason | |
| 87 | September 25 | 1997 | STS-86 | Atlantis | 10 d 19 h | Wetherbee | Bloomfield | Titov | Parazynski | Chrétien | Lawrence | Wolf Mir | Foale | |
| 88 | November 19 | 1997 | STS-87 | Columbia | 15 d 16 h | Kregel | Lindsey | Scott | Chawla | Doi | | | Kadenyuk | |
| 89 | January 22 | 1998 | STS-89 | Endeavour | 8 d 19 h | Wilcutt | Edwards | Dunbar PC | M. Anderson | Reilly | Sharipov | A. Thomas Mir | Wolf | |
| 90 | April 17 | 1998 | STS-90 | Columbia | 15 d 21 h | Searfoss | Altman | Linnehan | D. Williams | Hire | | | Buckey | Pawelczyk |
| 91 | June 2 | 1998 | STS-91 | Discovery | 9 d 19 h | Precourt | Gorie | Lawrence | Chang-Diaz | Kavandi | Ryumin | | A. Thomas | |
| 92 | October 29 | 1998 | STS-95 | Discovery | 8 d 21 h | C. Brown | Lindsey | Robinson PC | Parazynski | Duque | | | Mukai | Glenn |
| 93 | December 4 | 1998 | STS-88 | Endeavour | 11 d 19 h | Cabana | Sturckow | Currie | Ross | Newman | Krikalev | | | |
| 94 | May 27 | 1999 | STS-96 | Discovery | 9 d 19 h | Rominger | Husband | Ochoa | Jernigan | Barry | Payette | Tokarev | | |
| 95 | July 23 | 1999 | STS-93 | Columbia | 4 d 22 h | Collins | Ashby | Hawley | Coleman | Tognini | | | | |
| 96 | December 19 | 1999 | STS-103 | Discovery | 7 d 23 h | C. Brown | S. Kelly | S. Smith | Foale | Grunsfeld | Nicollier | Clervoy | | |
| 97 | February 11 | 2000 | STS-99 | Endeavour | 11 d 5 h | Kregel | Gorie | Kavandi | J. E. Voss | Mohri | Thiele | | | |
| 98 | May 19 | 2000 | STS-101 | Atlantis | 9 d 21 h | Halsell | Horowitz | Weber | J. Williams | J. S. Voss | Helms | Usachev | | |
| 99 | September 8 | 2000 | STS-106 | Atlantis | 11 d 19 h | Wilcutt | Altman | Burbank | Lu | Mastracchio | Malenchenko | Morukov | | |
| 100 | October 11 | 2000 | STS-92 | Discovery | 12 d 21 h | Duffy | Melroy | Wakata | Chiao | Wisoff | Lopez-Alegria | W. McArthur | | |
| 101 | November 30 | 2000 | STS-97 | Endeavour | 10 d 19 h | Jett | Bloomfield | Tanner | Noriega | Garneau | | | | |

== 2001–2005 ==
| Order | Day | Year | Mission | Shuttle | Duration | Commander | Pilot | Mission specialists | | | | | Payload specialists | | |
|---|---|---|---|---|---|---|---|---|---|---|---|---|---|---|---|
| 102 | February 7 | 2001 | STS-98 | Atlantis | 12 d 21 h | Cockrell | Polansky | Curbeam | Jones | Ivins | | | | | |
| 103 | March 8 | 2001 | STS-102 | Discovery | 12 d 19 h | Wetherbee | J. Kelly | A. Thomas | P. Richards | Usachev ISS | J. S. Voss ISS | Helms ISS | Shepherd | Gidzenko | Krikalev |
| 104 | April 19 | 2001 | STS-100 | Endeavour | 11 d 21 h | Rominger | Ashby | Hadfield | Parazynski | Phillips | Guidoni | Lonchakov | | | |
| 105 | July 12 | 2001 | STS-104 | Atlantis | 12 d 18 h | Lindsey | Hobaugh | Gernhardt | Reilly | Kavandi | | | | | |
| 106 | August 10 | 2001 | STS-105 | Discovery | 11 d 21 h | Horowitz | Sturckow | Barry | Forrester | Culbertson ISS | Tyurin ISS | Dezhurov ISS | Usachev | J. S. Voss | Helms |
| 107 | December 5 | 2001 | STS-108 | Endeavour | 11 d 19 h | Gorie | M. Kelly | Godwin | Tani | Onufrienko ISS | Walz ISS | Bursch ISS | Culbertson | Tyurin | Dezhurov |
| 108 | March 1 | 2002 | STS-109 | Columbia | 10 d 22 h | Altman | Carey | Grunsfeld PC | Currie | Newman | Linnehan | Massimino | | | |
| 109 | April 8 | 2002 | STS-110 | Atlantis | 10 d 19 h | Bloomfield | Frick | Ross | S. Smith | Ochoa | Morin | Walheim | | | |
| 110 | June 5 | 2002 | STS-111 | Endeavour | 13 d 20 h | Cockrell | Lockhart | Chang-Diaz | Perrin | Korzun ISS | Whitson ISS | Treshchev ISS | Onufrienko | Walz | Bursch |
| 111 | October 7 | 2002 | STS-112 | Atlantis | 10 d 19 h | Ashby | Melroy | Wolf | Sellers | Magnus | Yurchikhin | | | | |
| 112 | November 23 | 2002 | STS-113 | Endeavour | 13 d 18 h | Wetherbee | Lockhart | Lopez-Alegria | Herrington | Bowersox ISS | Budarin ISS | Pettit ISS | Korzun | Whitson | Treshchev |
| 113 | January 16 | 2003 | STS-107 | Columbia | 15 d 22 h | Husband | McCool | M. Anderson PC | D. Brown | Chawla | Clark | | Ramon | | |
| 114 | July 26 | 2005 | STS-114 | Discovery | 13 d 21 h | Collins | J. Kelly | Noguchi | Robinson | A. Thomas | Lawrence | Camarda | | | |

== 2006–2011 ==
| Order | Day | Year | Mission | Shuttle | Duration | Commander | Pilot | Mission specialists | | | | | Landing |
|---|---|---|---|---|---|---|---|---|---|---|---|---|---|
| 115 | July 4 | 2006 | STS-121 | Discovery | 12 d 18 h 36 min 48 s | Lindsey | M. Kelly | Fossum | Sellers | Nowak | Wilson | Reiter ISS | |
| 116 | September 9 | 2006 | STS-115 | Atlantis | 11 d 19 h 6 min 35 s | Jett | Ferguson | Tanner | Burbank FE | Stefanyshyn-Piper | MacLean | | |
| 117 | December 9 | 2006 | STS-116 | Discovery | 12 d 20 h 45 min 16 s | Polansky | Oefelein | Patrick | Curbeam | Fuglesang | Higginbotham | S. Williams ISS | Reiter |
| 118 | June 8 | 2007 | STS-117 | Atlantis | 13 d 20 h 12 min 44 s | Sturckow | Archambault | Forrester | Swanson | Olivas | Reilly | C. Anderson ISS | S. Williams |
| 119 | August 8 | 2007 | STS-118 | Endeavour | 12 d 17 h 55 min 34 s | S. Kelly | Hobaugh | Caldwell | Mastracchio | D. Williams | Morgan | Drew | |
| 120 | October 23 | 2007 | STS-120 | Discovery | 15 d 2 h 23 min 55 s | Melroy | Zamka | Wilson | Parazynski | Wheelock | Nespoli | Tani ISS | C. Anderson |
| 121 | February 7 | 2008 | STS-122 | Atlantis | 12 d 18 h 21 min 50 s | Frick | Poindexter | Melvin | Walheim | Schlegel | Love | Eyharts ISS | Tani |
| 122 | March 11 | 2008 | STS-123 | Endeavour | 15 d 18 h 12 min 27 s | Gorie | G. H. Johnson | Behnken | Foreman | Linnehan | Doi | Reisman ISS | Eyharts |
| 123 | May 31 | 2008 | STS-124 | Discovery | 13 d 18 h 14 min 7 s | M. Kelly | Ham | Nyberg | Garan | Fossum | Hoshide | Chamitoff ISS | Reisman |
| 124 | November 14 | 2008 | STS-126 | Endeavour | 15 d 20 h 30 min 34 s | Ferguson | Boe | Pettit | Bowen | Stefanyshyn-Piper | Kimbrough | Magnus ISS | Chamitoff |
| 125 | March 15 | 2009 | STS-119 | Discovery | 12 d 19 h 31 min 1 s | Archambault | Antonelli | Acaba | Swanson | Arnold | Phillips | Wakata ISS | Magnus |
| 126 | May 11 | 2009 | STS-125 | Atlantis | 12 d 21 h 38 min 19 s | Altman | G. C. Johnson | Good | M. McArthur | Grunsfeld | Massimino | Feustel | |
| 127 | July 15 | 2009 | STS-127 | Endeavour | 15 d 16 h 44 min 58 s | Polansky | Hurley | Cassidy | Payette | Marshburn | Wolf | Kopra ISS | Wakata |
| 128 | August 28 | 2009 | STS-128 | Discovery | 13 d 20 h 54 min 55 s | Sturckow | Ford | Forrester | Hernández | Fuglesang | Olivas | Stott ISS | Kopra |
| 129 | November 16 | 2009 | STS-129 | Atlantis | 10 d 19 h 16 min 13 s | Hobaugh | Wilmore | Melvin | Bresnik | Foreman | Satcher | | Stott |
| 130 | February 8 | 2010 | STS-130 | Endeavour | 13 d 18 h 8 min 3 s | Zamka | Virts | Hire | Robinson | Patrick | Behnken | | |
| 131 | April 5 | 2010 | STS-131 | Discovery | 15 d 2 h 47 min 11 s | Poindexter | Dutton | Mastracchio | Metcalf-Lindenburger | Wilson | Yamazaki | C. Anderson | |
| 132 | May 14 | 2010 | STS-132 | Atlantis | 11 d 18 h 29 min | Ham | Antonelli | Reisman | Good | Bowen | Sellers | | |
| 133 | February 24 | 2011 | STS-133 | Discovery | 12 d 19 h 4 min 50 s | Lindsey | Boe | Stott | Drew | Barratt | Bowen | | |
| 134 | May 16 | 2011 | STS-134 | Endeavour | 15 d 17 h 38 min 51 s | M. Kelly | G. H. Johnson | Fincke | Vittori | Feustel | Chamitoff | | |
| 135 | July 8 | 2011 | STS-135 | Atlantis | 12 d 18 h 28 min 50 s | Ferguson | Hurley | Magnus | Walheim | | | | |

== See also ==
- List of Space Shuttle missions
- Space Shuttle program
