= List of American astronauts by birthplace =

This article lists the birthplaces of astronauts from the United States' space program and other space travelers born in the United States or holding American citizenship. Space travelers who did not work for NASA are indicated in italics.

== Born in the United States ==
Astronauts who were born in 47 states, Guam, and the District of Columbia have flown in space. No astronauts have yet flown in space who were born in Nevada, Vermont or Wyoming.

=== Alabama ===
- Birmingham: Henry Hartsfield — STS-4, STS-41-D, STS-61-A
- Cordova: James Voss — STS-44, STS-53, STS-69, STS-101, STS-102/105
- Decatur: Mae Jemison, first African-American woman in space — STS-47
- Mobile: Kathryn P. Hire — STS-90, STS-130
- Mobile: Clifton Williams (1932–1967) — No spaceflights, died during astronaut training
- Montgomery: Kathryn C. Thornton, first woman to make multiple EVAs — STS-33, STS-49, STS-61, STS-73

=== Alaska ===
- Fairbanks: John Shoffner — Axiom Mission 2

=== Arizona ===
- Huachuca City: Timothy Creamer — Soyuz TMA-17
- Phoenix: Steven Smith — STS-68, STS-82, STS-103, STS-110

=== Arkansas ===
- Fayetteville: Richard O. Covey — STS-51-I, STS-26, STS-38, STS-61
- Little Rock: Scott E. Parazynski — STS-66, STS-86, STS-95, STS-100, STS-120

=== California ===
- Arcadia: Tracy Caldwell — STS-118, Soyuz TMA-18
- Arcadia: Steven W. Lindsey — STS-87, STS-95, STS-104, STS-121, STS-133
- French Camp: José M. Hernández — STS-128
- Fresno: Barbara Morgan — STS-118
- Fresno: James van Hoften — STS-41-C, STS-51-I
- Inglewood: Joseph M. Acaba — STS-119, Soyuz TMA-04M
- La Mesa: Frederick Sturckow — STS-88, STS-105, STS-117, STS-128
- Long Beach: Frederick Hauck — STS-7, STS-51-A, STS-26
- Los Angeles: Kevin P. Chilton — STS-49, STS-59, STS-76
- Los Angeles: Ellen Ochoa, first Hispanic woman in space — STS-56, STS-66, STS-96, STS-110
- North Hollywood: John D. Olivas — STS-117, STS-128
- Los Angeles: Sally Ride (1951–2012), first American woman in space — STS-7, STS-41-G
- Los Angeles: Francisco Rubio — Soyuz MS-22/MS-23
- Los Angeles: Jonny Kim — Soyuz MS-27
- Orange: Bryan D. O'Connor — STS-61-B, STS-40
- Palo Alto: Pamela Melroy — STS-92, STS-112, STS-120
- Palo Alto: Sarah Gillis — Polaris Dawn
- Pasadena: Alan G. Poindexter (1961–2012) — STS-122, STS-131
- Redwood City: Rex J. Walheim — STS-110, STS-122, STS-135
- Sacramento: Michael Coats — STS-41-D, STS-29, STS-39
- Sacramento: Stephen Robinson — STS-85, STS-95, STS-114, STS-130
- San Bernardino: Michael Clifford — STS-53, STS-59, STS-76
- San Diego: Stanley G. Love — STS-122
- San Diego: William C. McCool (1961–2003), — STS-107 died aboard Columbia
- San Diego: Michael J. McCulley — STS-34
- San Diego: Josh A. Cassada — SpaceX Crew-5
- San Francisco: John Young (1930–2018), first NASA astronaut to fly five and six times, first man to orbit the Moon on two missions — Gemini 3, Gemini 10, Apollo 10, Apollo 16, STS-1, STS-9
- Pomona: Victor Glover, first African American astronaut to go to the ISS on a long-duration flight — SpaceX Crew-1, Artemis II
- Petaluma: Nicole Aunapu Mann — SpaceX Crew-5

=== Colorado ===
- Boulder: Scott Carpenter (1925–2013) — Mercury 7
- Colorado Springs: Dorothy M. Metcalf-Lindenburger — STS-131

Colorado Springs, Colorado: Nichole Ayers — SpaceX Crew-10

- Del Norte: Kent Rominger — STS-73, STS-80, STS-85, STS-96, STS-100
- Denver: Gerald P. Carr — Skylab 4
- Denver: John M. Lounge — STS-51-I, STS-26, STS-35
- Denver: John "Jack" Swigert (1931–1982) — Apollo 13
- Durango: Stuart Roosa (1933–1994) — Apollo 14
- Longmont: Vance D. Brand — Apollo-Soyuz Test Project, STS-5, STS-41-B, STS-35
- Louisville: Jack D. Fischer — Soyuz MS-04
- Wheat Ridge: Matthew Dominick — SpaceX Crew-8

=== Connecticut ===
- Farmington: Kathleen Rubins — Soyuz MS-01, Soyuz MS-17
- Groton: Pierre Thuot — STS-36, STS-49, STS-62
- Hartford: Sherwood C. Spring — STS-61-B
- Manchester: Daniel C. Burbank — STS-106, STS-115, Soyuz TMA-22
- Norwalk: Daniel T. Barry — STS-72, STS-96, STS-105
- Waterbury: Richard Mastracchio — STS-106, STS-118, STS-131, Soyuz TMA-11M

=== Delaware ===
- Wilmington: Nancy Currie — STS-57, STS-70, STS-88, STS-109

=== District of Columbia ===
- Washington: B. Alvin Drew — STS-118, STS-133
- Washington: Frederick D. Gregory — STS-51-B, STS-33, STS-44
- Washington: Lisa Nowak — STS-121
- Washington: Robert L. Stewart — STS-41-B, STS-51-J

=== Florida ===
- Cocoa Beach: N. Jan Davis — STS-47, STS-60, STS-85
- Jacksonville: Wendy B. Lawrence — STS-67, STS-86, STS-91, STS-114
- Key West: Richard N. Richards — STS-28, STS-41, STS-50, STS-64
- Marianna: Norman Thagard — STS-7, STS-51-B, STS-30, STS-42, Soyuz TM-21/STS-71
- Miami: Eric A. Boe — STS-126, STS-133
- Miami: William B. Lenoir (1939–2010) — STS-5
- Miami: Bill Nelson, second politician in space, — STS-61-C
- Miami: Winston E. Scott — STS-72, STS-87
- Tallahassee: Samuel T. Durrance — STS-35, STS-67

=== Georgia ===
- Albany: Thomas J. Hennen — STS-44
- Atlanta: Roy D. Bridges Jr. — STS-51-F
- Augusta: Susan Still — STS-83, STS-94
- Columbus: David M. Walker, (1944–2001) — STS-51-A, STS-30, STS-53, STS-69
- Macon: Sonny Carter, (1947–1991) — STS-33
- Savannah: L. Blaine Hammond — STS-39, STS-64

=== Guam ===
- Hagåtña: Sian Proctor — Inspiration4

=== Hawaii ===
- Honolulu: K. Megan McArthur — STS-125, SpaceX Crew-2
- Kealakekua: Ellison Onizuka (1946–1986), died aboard Challenger — STS-51-C

=== Idaho ===
- Mountain Home Air Force Base: James F. Reilly — STS-89, STS-104, STS-117
- Pocatello: Kayla Barron — SpaceX Crew-3

=== Illinois ===
- Belleville: Sandra Magnus — STS-112, STS-126/119, STS-135
- Canton: Steven R. Nagel — STS-51-G, STS-61-A, STS-37, STS-55
- Chanute Air Force Base: Carl J. Meade — STS-38, STS-50, STS-64
- Chicago: Eugene A. Cernan (1934–2017), last person (as of December 2023) to walk on the Moon — Gemini 9A, Apollo 10, Apollo 17
- Chicago: John M. Grunsfeld — STS-67, STS-81, STS-103, STS-109, STS-125
- Chicago: Joan Higginbotham — STS-116
- Chicago: Thomas K. Mattingly (1936–2023) — Apollo 16, STS-4, STS-51-C
- Chicago: James McDivitt — Gemini 4, Apollo 9
- Chicago: Charles Veach (1944–1995) — STS-39, STS-52
- Danville: Joseph R. Tanner — STS-66, STS-82, STS-97, STS-115
- Lincoln: Scott Altman — STS-90, STS-106, STS-109, STS-125
- Oak Park: Lee Archambault — STS-117, STS-119
- Oak Park: Joseph P. Kerwin — Skylab 2
- Rock Island: Gary Payton — STS-51-C
- Urbana: Zena Cardman — SpaceX Crew-11

=== Indiana ===
- Bedford: Charles D. Walker — STS-41-D, STS-51-D, STS-61-B
- Crawfordsville: Joseph P. Allen — STS-5, STS-51-A
- Crown Point: Jerry L. Ross — STS-61-B, STS-27, STS-37, STS-55, STS-74, STS-88, STS-110
- Gary: Frank Borman, commanded the first spaceflight to orbit the Moon — Gemini 7, Apollo 8
- Indianapolis: Serena M. Auñón — Expedition 56 Expedition 57
- Indianapolis: Anthony W. England — STS-51-F
- Indianapolis: David Wolf — STS-58, STS-86/89, STS-112, STS-127
- Lafayette: Donald Williams (1942–2016) — STS-51-D, STS-34
- Mitchell: Virgil I. "Gus" Grissom (1926–1967), first NASA astronaut to go into space twice. Died in the Apollo 1 launchpad fire — Mercury-Redstone 4, Gemini 3
- Portland: Kevin A. Ford — STS-128, Soyuz TMA-06M
- South Bend: Janice E. Voss (1956–2012) — STS-57, STS-63, STS-83, STS-94, STS-99
- Valparaiso: Mark N. Brown — STS-28, STS-48
- Clinton: Charles Edward "Chuck" Jones (1952–2001), casualty of 9/11 - No spaceflights

=== Iowa ===
- Ames: Laurel Clark (1961–2003), died aboard Columbia — STS-107
- Burlington: James M. Kelly — STS-102, STS-114
- Charles City: George Nelson — STS-41-C, STS-61-C, STS-26
- Clinton: David C. Hilmers — STS-51-J, STS-26, STS-36, STS-42
- Creston: Walter Cunningham — Apollo 7
- Jefferson: Loren Shriver — STS-51-C, STS-31, STS-46
- Mount Ayr: Peggy Whitson — STS-111/113, Soyuz TMA-11, Axiom Mission 2, Axiom mission 4

=== Kansas ===
- Belleville: Nick Hague — Soyuz MS-10, Soyuz MS-12, SpaceX Crew-9
- Chapman: Joseph Henry Engle — STS-2, STS-51-I
- Ottawa: Steven Hawley — STS-41-D, STS-61-C, STS-31, STS-82, STS-93
- St. Francis: Ronald Evans (1933–1990) — Apollo 17

=== Kentucky ===
- Fort Knox: Randolph Bresnik — STS-129, Soyuz MS-05
- Russellville: Terrence Wilcutt — STS-68, STS-79, STS-89, STS-106

=== Louisiana ===
- Baton Rouge: Hayley Arceneaux — Inspiration4
- Lake Charles: Dominic L. Pudwill Gorie — STS-91, STS-99, STS-108, STS-123
- West Monroe: James D. Halsell — STS-65, STS-74, STS-83, STS-94, STS-101

=== Maine ===
- Bar Harbor: Charles O. Hobaugh — STS-104, STS-108, STS-129
- Caribou: Jessica Meir — Soyuz MS-15

=== Maryland ===
- Baltimore: Robert Curbeam — STS-85, STS-98, STS-116
- Baltimore: Marsha Ivins — STS-32, STS-46, STS-62, STS-81, STS-98
- Baltimore: Thomas David Jones — STS-59, STS-68, STS-80, STS-98
- Baltimore: Terry W. Virts — STS-130, Soyuz TMA-15M
- Baltimore: Reid Wiseman — Soyuz TMA-13M, Artemis II
- Cheverly: Richard R. Arnold — STS-119
- Gaithersburg: Jessica Watkins — SpaceX Crew-4
- Patuxent River: Kenneth S. Reightler Jr. — STS-48, STS-60

=== Massachusetts ===
- Attleboro: Scott D. Tingle — Soyuz MS-07
- Boston: Brian Duffy — STS-45, STS-57, STS-72, STS-92
- Boston: Christa McAuliffe (1948–1986) — No spaceflights; died on the Challenger
- Boston: Bruce McCandless II (1937–2017) — STS-41-B, STS-31
- Boston: Story Musgrave — STS-6, STS-51-F, STS-33, STS-44, STS-61, STS-80
- Boston: Brian O'Leary — No spaceflights
- Boston: Albert Sacco — STS-73
- Boston: Stephanie Wilson — STS-121, STS-120, STS-131
- Cohasset: Stephen G. Bowen — STS-126, STS-132, STS-133, SpaceX Crew-6
- Lowell: Richard M. Linnehan — STS-78, STS-90, STS-109, STS-123
- Salem: Christopher Cassidy — STS-127, Soyuz TMA-08M, Soyuz MS-16
- Springfield: Jerome Apt — STS-37, STS-47, STS-59, STS-79
- Springfield: Ed Lu — STS-84, STS-106, Soyuz TMA-2
- Waltham: Charles J. Precourt — STS-55, STS-71, STS-84, STS-91

=== Michigan ===
- Cass City: Brewster H. Shaw — STS-9, STS-61-B, STS-28
- Detroit: Dominic A. Antonelli — STS-119, STS-132
- Detroit: Gregory Jarvis (1944–1986) — No spaceflights; died aboard Challenger
- East Detroit: Jerry M. Linenger — STS-64, STS-81/84
- Flint: Michael J. Bloomfield — STS-86, STS-97, STS-110
- Flint: Donald R. McMonagle — STS-39, STS-54, STS-66
- Grand Rapids: Roger B. Chaffee (1935–1967) — No spaceflights; died on Apollo 1
- Grand Rapids: Christina Koch — Soyuz MS-12, Soyuz MS-13, Artemis II
- Grand Rapids: Jack R. Lousma — Skylab 3, STS-3
- Jackson: Alfred Worden — Apollo 15
- Mount Clemens: Richard A. Searfoss — STS-58, STS-76, STS-90
- Muskegon: David Leestma — STS-41-G, STS-28, STS-45
- Pontiac: Brent W. Jett Jr. — STS-72, STS-81, STS-97, STS-115

=== Minnesota ===
- Fairmont: Dale Gardner — STS-8, STS-51-A
- Minneapolis: Robert D. Cabana — STS-41, STS-53, STS-65, STS-88
- Minneapolis: Anil Menon — Soyuz MS-29
- Parkers Prairie: Karen L. Nyberg — STS-124, Soyuz TMA-09M
- St. Paul: Duane G. Carey — STS-109
- St. Paul: Heidemarie M. Stefanyshyn-Piper — STS-115, STS-126

=== Mississippi ===
- Biloxi: Fred Haise — Apollo 13
- Fayette: Richard H. Truly — STS-2, STS-8
- Winona: Donald H. Peterson — STS-6

=== Missouri ===
- Cape Girardeau: Linda M. Godwin — STS-37, STS-59, STS-76, STS-108
- Carthage: Janet L. Kavandi — STS-91, STS-99, STS-104
- Lebanon: Michael S. Hopkins — Soyuz TMA-10M, SpaceX Crew-1
- St. Ann: Robert L. Behnken — STS-123, STS-130, SpaceX DM-2
- St. Louis: Thomas Akers — STS-41, STS-49, STS-61, STS-79
- St. Louis: Robert C. Springer — STS-29, STS-38

=== Montana ===
- Lewistown: Loren Acton — STS-51-F

=== Nebraska ===
- Omaha: Clayton Anderson — STS-117/120, STS-131

=== New Hampshire ===
- Derry: Alan Shepard (1923–1998), first American in space — Mercury-Redstone 3, Apollo 14
- Manchester: Lee M.E. Morin — STS-110

=== New Jersey ===
- Englewood: Gregory Linteris — STS-83, STS-94
- Glen Ridge: Edwin E. "Buzz" Aldrin, the second person to walk on the Moon — Gemini 12, Apollo 11
- Hackensack: William Pailes — STS-51-J
- Hackensack: Walter M. "Wally" Schirra (1923–2007), first NASA astronaut to fly three times — Mercury 8, Gemini 6A, Apollo 7
- Jersey City: George D. Zamka — STS-120, STS-130
- Morristown: Garrett Reisman — STS-123/124, STS-132
- Neptune: Rusty Schweickart — Apollo 9
- Orange: Mark E. Kelly — STS-108, STS-121, STS-124, STS-134
- Orange: Scott J. Kelly — STS-103, STS-118, Soyuz TMA-01M, Soyuz TMA-17M
- Paterson: Mark L. Polansky — STS-98, STS-116, STS-127
- Paterson: Kathryn Dwyer Sullivan, first American woman to walk in space — STS-41-G, STS-31, STS-45
- Plainfield: Kenneth Ham — STS-124, STS-132
- Union: Jared Isaacman – Inspiration4, Polaris Dawn

=== New Mexico ===
- Albuquerque: Sidney M. Gutierrez — STS-40, STS-59
- Carlsbad: F. Drew Gaffney — STS-40
- Santa Rita: Harrison Schmitt — Apollo 17

=== New York ===
- Albany: Nicole P. Stott — STS-128, STS-133
- Amityville: Kevin R. Kregel — STS-70, STS-78, STS-87, STS-99
- Binghamton: Douglas H. Wheelock — STS-120, Soyuz TMA-19
- Buffalo: Edward Gibson — Skylab 4
- Buffalo: James Pawelczyk — STS-90
- Cooperstown: Robert L. Gibson — STS-41-B, STS-61-C, STS-27, STS-47, STS-71
- Elmira: Eileen Collins, first female Commander of a spaceflight — STS-63, STS-84, STS-93, STS-114
- Endicott: Douglas G. Hurley — STS-127, STS-135, SpaceX DM-2
- Lockport: William G. Gregory — STS-67
- New York: Karol J. Bobko, first graduate of the United States Air Force Academy to become an astronaut — STS-6, STS-51-D, STS-51-J
- New York: Jay C. Buckey — STS-90
- New York (Queens): Charles Camarda — STS-114
- New York (Brooklyn): Martin J. Fettman — STS-58
- New York: Anna Lee Fisher — STS-51-A
- New York: Ronald J. Grabe — STS-51-J, STS-30, STS-42, STS-57
- New York (Brooklyn): Jeffrey A. Hoffman — STS-51-D, STS-35, STS-46, STS-61, STS-75
- New York: Bruce E. Melnick — STS-41, STS-49
- New York (Brooklyn): Gregory Olsen, third space tourist — Soyuz TMA-7/6
- New York: Robert A. Parker — STS-9, STS-35
- New York (Bronx): Mario Runco Jr. — STS-44, STS-54, STS-77
- New York (Queens): Dennis Tito, first space tourist — Soyuz TM-32/31
- New York (Queens): Jim Wetherbee — STS-32, STS-52, STS-63, STS-86, STS-102, STS-113
- Oceanside: Michael Massimino — STS-109, STS-125
- Plattsburgh: Michael P. Anderson, (1959–2003), died aboard Columbia — STS-89, STS-107
- Rochester: C. Gordon Fullerton (1936–2013) — STS-3, STS-51-F
- Southampton: Mary L. Cleave — STS-61-B, STS-30
- Syracuse: Lawrence J. DeLucas — STS-50
- Syracuse: Jeanette J. Epps — SpaceX Crew-8
- Syracuse: Steven Swanson — STS-117, STS-119, Soyuz TMA-12M
- Warsaw: James C. Adamson — STS-28, STS-43
- Yonkers: Ronald J. Garan Jr. — STS-124

=== North Carolina ===
- Beaufort: Michael J. Smith (1945–1986) — Pilot; died aboard Challenger
- Charlotte: Charles Moss Duke Jr. — Apollo 16, Youngest to walk on the moon
- Charlotte: Susan J. Helms — STS-54, STS-64, STS-78, STS-101, STS-102/105
- Elizabethtown: Curtis Brown — STS-47, STS-66, STS-77, STS-85, STS-95, STS-103
- Faison: William E. Thornton — STS-8, STS-51-B
- Fayetteville: Ellen S. Baker — STS-34, STS-50, STS-71
- Fayetteville: Robert Hines — SpaceX Crew-4
- Laurinburg: William S. McArthur — STS-58, STS-74, STS-92, Soyuz TMA-7
- Pinehurst: Charles E. Brady Jr. (1951–2006) — STS-78
- Statesville: Thomas Marshburn — STS-127, Soyuz TMA-07M, SpaceX Crew-2

=== North Dakota ===
- Jamestown: Richard Hieb — STS-39, STS-49, STS-65
- New Rockford: James Buchli — STS-51-C, STS-61-A, STS-29, STS-48

=== Ohio ===
- Akron: Judith Resnik (1949–1986), died aboard Challenger — STS-41-D
- Bryan: Terence T. Henricks — STS-44, STS-55, STS-70, STS-78
- Cambridge: John Glenn (1921–2016), first American in Earth orbit, U.S. Senator, and became the first person older than 70 to make a spaceflight — Mercury 6, STS-95
- Cincinnati: Karl Gordon Henize (1926–1993) — STS-51-F
- Cleveland: Kenneth D. Cameron — STS-37, STS-56, STS-74
- Cleveland: Gregory J. Harbaugh — STS-39, STS-54, STS-71, STS-82
- Cleveland: Jim Lovell, first NASA astronaut to fly four times, first man to fly to the Moon twice — Gemini 7, Gemini 12, Apollo 8, Apollo 13
- Cleveland: G. David Low (1956–2008) — STS-32, STS-43, STS-57
- Cleveland: Donald A. Thomas — STS-65, STS-70, STS-83, STS-94
- Cleveland: Carl Walz — STS-51, STS-65, STS-79, STS-108/111
- Cleveland: Mary E. Weber — STS-70, STS-101
- Columbus: Donn F. Eisele (1930–1987) — Apollo 7
- Columbus: Michael Foreman — STS-123, STS-129
- Dayton: Charles Bassett (1931–1966) — No spaceflights, died during astronaut training
- Dayton: Larry Connor — Axiom-1
- Euclid: Sunita Williams First female astronaut to fly on an orbital spacecraft's maiden flight — STS-116/117, Soyuz TMA-05M, Starliner Crewed Flight Test/SpaceX Crew-9
- Lorain: Robert F. Overmyer (1936–1996) — STS-5, STS-51-B
- Macedonia: Ronald Sega — STS-60, STS-76
- Mansfield: Michael L. Gernhardt — STS-69, STS-83, STS-94, STS-104
- Parma: Michael T. Good — STS-125, STS-132
- Wapakoneta: Neil Armstrong (1930–2012), piloted first docking in space, first person to land a spacecraft on the Moon, first person to walk on the Moon — Gemini 8, Apollo 11
- Warren: Ronald A. Parise (1951–2008) — STS-35, STS-67

=== Oklahoma ===
- Enid: Owen K. Garriott — Skylab 3, STS-9
- Okemah: William R. Pogue — Skylab 4
- Shawnee: Gordon Cooper (1927–2004), the first American to fly in space for a day — Mercury 9, Gemini 5
- Weatherford: Thomas Patten Stafford, only person to fly twice in 6 months — Gemini 6A, Gemini 9A, Apollo 10, Apollo-Soyuz Test Project
- Wetumka: John Herrington, first Native American in space — STS-113

=== Oregon ===
- Eugene: James Dutton — STS-131
- Portland: S. David Griggs (1938–1989) — STS-51-D
- Silverton: Donald Pettit — STS-113/Soyuz TMA-1, STS-126, Soyuz TMA-03M, Soyuz MS-26

=== Pennsylvania ===
- Abington: John-David F. Bartoe — STS-51-F
- Bristol: Daniel W. Bursch — STS-51, STS-68, STS-77, STS-108, STS-111
- Erie: Paul J. Weitz — Skylab 2, STS-6
- Haverford: Theodore Freeman (1930–1964) — No spaceflights, died during astronaut training
- Indiana: Patricia Robertson (1963–2001) — No spaceflights
- Lancaster: Andrew J. Feustel — STS-125, STS-134
- Philadelphia: Andrew M. Allen — STS-46, STS-62, STS-75
- Philadelphia: James P. Bagian — STS-29, STS-40
- Philadelphia: Guion Bluford, first African-American in space — STS-8, STS-61-A, STS-39, STS-53
- Philadelphia: Pete Conrad (1930–1999), commanded first precision landing on the Moon — Gemini 5, Gemini 11, Apollo 12, Skylab 2
- Philadelphia: Christopher Ferguson — STS-115, STS-126, STS-135
- Philadelphia: Scott J. Horowitz — STS-75, STS-82, STS-101, STS-105
- Pittsburgh: Michael Fincke — Soyuz TMA-4, Soyuz TMA-13, STS-134, SpaceX Crew-11
- Pittsburgh: Stephen Frick — STS-110, STS-122
- Pittsburgh: Terry Jonathan Hart — STS-41-C
- Pittsburgh: Warren Hoburg — SpaceX Crew-6
- Pittsburgh: James Irwin (1930–1991) — Apollo 15
- Ridley Park: Daniel Tani — STS-108, STS-120/122
- Scranton: Paul W. Richards — STS-102
- Stroudsburg: Byron Lichtenberg, first NASA payload specialist — STS-9, STS-45
- Uniontown: Robert J. Cenker — STS-61-C

=== Rhode Island ===
- Quonset Point: William F. Readdy — STS-42, STS-51, STS-79

=== South Carolina ===
- Charleston: Catherine "Cady" Coleman — STS-73, STS-93, Soyuz TMA-20
- Charleston: Frank L. Culbertson Jr. — STS-38, STS-51, STS-105/108
- Columbia: Charles Bolden, first African-American Commander of a spaceflight — STS-61-C, STS-31, STS-45, STS-60
- Greenville: John Casper — STS-36, STS-54, STS-62, STS-77
- Lake City: Ronald McNair (1950–1986), died aboard Challenger — STS-41-B

=== South Dakota ===
- Sioux Falls: Michael E. Fossum — STS-121, STS-124, Soyuz TMA-02M
- Yankton: Charles D. Gemar — STS-38, STS-48, STS-62

=== Tennessee ===
- Chattanooga: Tamara E. Jernigan — STS-40, STS-52, STS-67, STS-80, STS-96
- Chattanooga: Scott Poteet — Polaris Dawn
- Jamestown: Roger K. Crouch — STS-83, STS-94
- Memphis: Michael A. Baker — STS-43, STS-52, STS-68, STS-81
- Memphis: John S. Bull (1934–2008) — No spaceflights
- Murfreesboro: Margaret Rhea Seddon — STS-51-D, STS-40, STS-58
- Murfreesboro: Robert L. Gibson♂ — STS-41-B, STS-61-C, STS-27, STS-47, STS-71
- Murfreesboro: Barry E. Wilmore — STS-129, Soyuz TMA-14M, Starliner Crewed Flight Test/SpaceX Crew-9
- Oak Ridge: William Shepherd — STS-27, STS-41, STS-52, Soyuz TM-31/STS-102

=== Texas ===
- Amarillo: Rick Husband (1957–2003), died aboard Columbia — STS-96, STS-107
- Amarillo: Paul Lockhart — STS-111, STS-113
- Austin: Kenneth Cockrell — STS-56, STS-69, STS-80, STS-98, STS-111
- Austin: Timothy L. Kopra — STS-127/128, Soyuz TMA-19M
- Beaumont: Robert Crippen, flew on first Space Shuttle mission — STS-1, STS-7, STS-41-C, STS-41-G
- Dallas: Jeffrey Ashby — STS-93, STS-100, STS-112
- Dallas: William Frederick Fisher — STS-51-I
- Dallas: Donald Holmquest — No spaceflights
- Dallas: Elliot See (1927–1966) — No spaceflights, died during astronaut training
- El Paso: Patrick G. Forrester — STS-105, STS-117, STS-128
- Goose Creek: John M. Fabian — STS-7, STS-51-G
- Hereford: Edgar Mitchell (1930–2016) — Apollo 14
- Houston: Loral O'Hara — Soyuz MS-24
- Houston: Anna Menon — Polaris Dawn
- Houston: Andy Sadhwani — Galactic 07
- Houston: Shannon Walker — Soyuz TMA-19, SpaceX Crew-1
- Killeen: Robert S. Kimbrough — STS-126
- Mineral Wells: Millie Hughes-Fulford, first female Payload Specialist — STS-40
- Orange: John Oliver Creighton — STS-51-G, STS-36, STS-48
- Quanah: Edward Givens (1930–1967) — No spaceflights
- Randolph Air Force Base: David Scott, first to drive a wheeled vehicle on the Moon — Gemini 8, Apollo 9, Apollo 15
- San Antonio: John E. Blaha — STS-29, STS-33, STS-43, STS-58, STS-79/81
- San Antonio: Edward White (1930–1967), first American to perform an EVA. Died in the Apollo 1 disaster — Gemini 4
- Temple: Bernard A. Harris Jr., first African-American to walk in space. — STS-55, STS-63
- Wheeler: Alan Bean (1932–2018) — Apollo 12, Skylab 3
- Wichita Falls: Richard M. Mullane — STS-41-D, STS-27, STS-36

=== Utah ===
- Midvale: Don L. Lind — STS-51-B
- Richfield: Jake Garn, ex-U.S. Senator, first politician in space — STS-51-D

=== Vermont ===
- Newport: Duane Graveline (1931–2016) — No spaceflights

=== Virginia ===
- Altavista: Guy Gardner — STS-27, STS-35
- Arlington: David McDowell Brown (1956–2003), died aboard Columbia — STS-107
- Falls Church: Mark T. Vande Hei — Soyuz MS-06, Soyuz MS-18
- Fort Belvoir: William Oefelein — STS-116
- Fort Belvoir: John L. Phillips — STS-100, Soyuz TMA-6, STS-119
- Hampton: Robert Satcher — STS-129
- Lynchburg: Leland D. Melvin — STS-122, STS-129
- Norfolk: Peter Wisoff — STS-57, STS-68, STS-81, STS-92
- Portsmouth: Ken Bowersox — STS-50, STS-61, STS-73, STS-82, STS-113/Soyuz TMA-1
- Richmond: Joe F. Edwards Jr. — STS-89

=== Washington ===
- Cle Elum: F. Richard "Dick" Scobee (1939–1986), died aboard Challenger — STS-41-C
- Seattle: Richard F. Gordon Jr. — Gemini 11, Apollo 12
- Seattle: Gregory C. Johnson — STS-125
- Seattle: Stephen S. Oswald — STS-42, STS-56, STS-67
- Seattle: Christopher Sembroski — Inspiration4
- Spokane: Anne C. McClain — Soyuz MS-11, SpaceX Crew-10SpaceX Crew-10]
- Sunnyside: Bonnie J. Dunbar — STS-61-A, STS-32, STS-50, STS-71, STS-89
- Vancouver: Michael R. Barratt — Soyuz TMA-14, STS-133, SpaceX Crew-8

=== West Virginia ===
- Charleston: Jon McBride — STS-41-G
- Morgantown: Andrew R. "Drew" Morgan — Soyuz MS-13, Soyuz MS-15

=== Wisconsin ===
- La Crosse: Curt Michel (1934–2015) — No spaceflights
- Milwaukee: Leroy Chiao — STS-65, STS-72, STS-92, Soyuz TMA-5
- Milwaukee: Raja Chari — SpaceX Crew-3
- Sparta: Donald K. "Deke" Slayton (1924–1993) — Apollo-Soyuz Test Project
- Superior: Jeffrey Williams — STS-101, Soyuz TMA-8, Soyuz TMA-16, Soyuz TMA-20M
- Viroqua: Mark C. Lee — STS-30, STS-47, STS-64, STS-82
- Watertown: Daniel Brandenstein — STS-8, STS-51-G, STS-32, STS-49

== Born in other countries ==
=== Australia ===
- Adelaide: Andy Thomas — STS-77, STS-89, STS-91, STS-102, STS-114
- Melbourne: Philip K. Chapman — No spaceflights
- Sydney: Paul D. Scully-Power — STS-41-G

=== Canada ===
- Montreal: Gregory Chamitoff — STS-124/126, STS-134

=== Costa Rica ===
- San José: Franklin Chang Díaz — STS-34, STS-46, STS-60, STS-61-C, STS-75, STS-91, STS-111

=== China ===
- Shanghai: Shannon Lucid, first woman to go on a long-duration space mission — STS-51-G, STS-34, STS-43, STS-58, STS-76/79

=== Taiwan ===
- Taipei: Kjell Lindgren — Soyuz TMA-17M, SpaceX Crew-4

=== Germany ===
- Bad Nauheim: Jasmin Moghbeli — SpaceX Crew-7

=== Hungary ===
- Budapest: Charles Simonyi. Fifth space tourist — Soyuz TMA-10/9, Soyuz TMA-14/13

=== India ===
- Guntur: Sirisha Bandla first Indian-American space tourist — Virgin Galactic Unity 22
- Karnal: Kalpana Chawla (1962–2003), first Indian-American in space. Died in the Space Shuttle Columbia disaster — STS-87, STS-107

=== Iran ===
- Mashhad: Anousheh Ansari, first Iranian-American in space. Fourth space tourist and first female space tourist. — Soyuz TMA-9/8

=== Italy ===
- Rome: Michael Collins — Gemini 10, Apollo 11

=== Micronesia ===
- Micronesia: James H. Newman — STS-51, STS-69, STS-88, STS-109

=== Panama ===
- Anćon: Frederick W. Leslie — STS-73

=== Peru ===
- Lima: Carlos I. Noriega — STS-84, STS-97

=== The Netherlands ===
- Sluiskil: Lodewijk van den Berg — STS-51-B

=== Spain ===
- Madrid: Michael López-Alegría — STS-73, STS-92, STS-113, Soyuz TMA-9, Axiom-1

=== United Kingdom ===
- Cambridge, England: Richard Garriott — Soyuz TMA-13/12
- Cardiff, Wales: Anthony Llewellyn — No spaceflights
- Crowborough, England: Piers Sellers — STS-112, STS-121, STS-132
- Louth, England: Michael Foale, dual British and American citizen — STS-45, STS-56, STS-63, STS-84/86, STS-103, Soyuz TMA-3
- Saltburn-by-the-Sea, England: Nicholas Patrick — STS-116, STS-130
- South Ruislip, England: Gregory H. Johnson — STS-123, STS-134
