= Hire =

Hire or HIRE may refer to:

- Employment
- Rental or Equipment rental
- Payment for the use of a ship under a time charter
- Hire (surname)
- Hire (Messenia), a town of ancient Messenia, Greece
- Hire, Nebraska, a community in the United States
- Hire Township, McDonough County, Illinois, a township in the United States
- Hiré, a town in the Ivory Coast
- Hiring Incentives to Restore Employment Act, a United States law enacted in 2010
- The Hire, short film series

== See also ==
- Haier, Chinese home appliances and electronics company
- Hires (disambiguation)
