= Hires =

Hires may refer to:

- High Resolution Fly's Eye, ultra-high-energy cosmic ray observatory
- High Resolution Echelle Spectrometer or High Resolution Echelle Spectrograph, W. M. Keck Observatory's spectrometer
- Hires Big H, restaurant chain headquartered in Utah, U.S.
- Hires Root Beer
- Hires (surname)

== See also ==
- Hire (disambiguation)
