= Hire (surname) =

Hire is a surname. Notable people with the name include:

- Greg Hire (born 1987), Australian basketball player
- Kathryn P. Hire (born 1959), American astronaut
- Lois Hire (1916–2006), American television writer

== See also ==
- Hires (surname)
