= Hires (surname) =

Hires is a surname. Notable people with the surname include:

- Charles Elmer Hires (1851–1937), American pharmacist
- Chryssandra Hires (born 1966), American handball player
- George Hires (1835–1911), American politician
- Justin Hires (born 1985), American comedian and actor
- Matt Hires (born 1985), American singer-songwriter

== See also ==
- Hire (surname)
