= Brian Duffy (astronaut) =

American astronaut and Air Force colonel (born 1953)

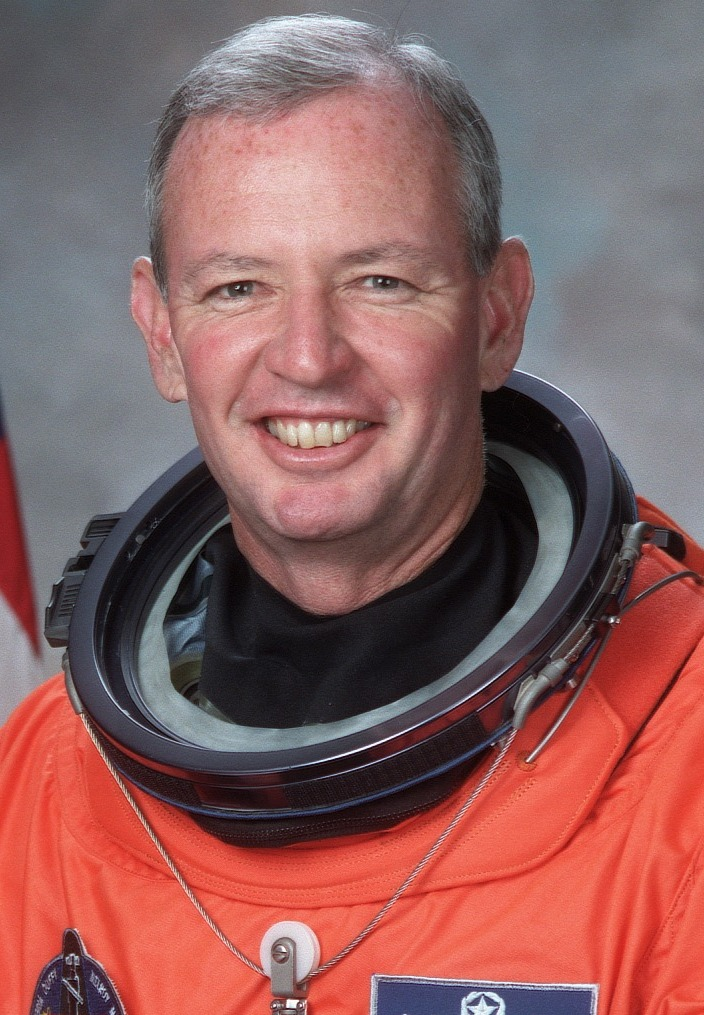
- Born: June 20, 1953 (age 73); Rockland, Massachusetts, U.S.
- Education: United States Air Force Academy (BS); University of Southern California (MS)
- Space career

NASA astronaut
- Rank: Colonel, USAF
- Time in space: 40d 17h 37m
- Selection: NASA Group 11 (1985)
- Missions: STS-45; STS-57; STS-72; STS-92

Brian Duffy (born June 20, 1953) is a retired U.S. Air Force colonel and a former NASA astronaut. He flew aboard four Space Shuttle missions.

== Education ==
Duffy graduated from Rockland High School, Rockland, Massachusetts in 1971. In 1975 he received a Bachelor of Science degree in mathematics from the United States Air Force Academy and completed Undergraduate Pilot Training as part of Class 76-10 at Columbus Air Force Base, Mississippi, in August 1976. In 1981, he received a Master of Science degree in systems management from the University of Southern California.

== Military career ==
After graduating from the USAF Academy in 1975, Duffy was selected to fly the F-15 and was stationed at Langley Air Force Base, Virginia, until 1979, when he transferred to Kadena Air Base, Okinawa, Japan. He flew F-15s there until 1982 when he was selected to attend the U.S. Air Force Test Pilot School at Edwards Air Force Base in California and then became the Director of F-15 Flight Test at Eglin Air Force Base, Florida.

Duffy logged over 5,000 hours of flight time in more than 25 different aircraft.

== NASA career ==
Selected by NASA in June 1985, Duffy became an astronaut in July 1986. He participated in the development and testing of displays, flight crew procedures, and computer software to be used on Shuttle flights. He served as spacecraft communicator (CAPCOM) in Mission Control during numerous Space Shuttle missions. He also served as Assistant Director (Technical) and as Deputy Director (Acting) of the Johnson Space Center. In this role he assisted the Center Director in the direction and management of JSC's resources, functions, programs, and projects assigned to the center. A veteran of four space flights, he has logged a total of 40 days, 17 hours, 34 minutes and 59 seconds in space.

=== Space flight experience ===
Duffy was the pilot on STS-45 Atlantis (March 24 to April 2, 1992), the first of the ATLAS series of missions to address the atmosphere and its interaction with the Sun.

He also was the pilot on STS-57 Endeavour (June 21 to July 1, 1993). Mission highlights included retrieval of the European Retrievable Carrier with the Shuttle's robotic arm, a spacewalk by two crew members, and an assortment of experiments in the first flight of the Spacehab middeck augmentation module.

Duffy next commanded a six-man crew on STS-72 Endeavour (January 11–20, 1996). During the 9-day flight, the crew retrieved the Space Flyer Unit (launched from Japan 10-months earlier), deployed and retrieved the OAST-Flyer, and conducted two spacewalks to demonstrate and evaluate techniques to be used in the assembly of the International Space Station.

Duffy commanded a crew of seven on STS-92 Discovery (October 11–24, 2000). During the 13-day flight, the seven member crew attached the Z1 Truss and Pressurized Mating Adapter 3 to the International Space Station using Discovery's robotic arm and performed four spacewalks to configure these elements. This expansion of the ISS opened the door for future assembly missions and prepared the station for its first resident crew.

== Post-retirement business career ==
Duffy retired from the Air Force and NASA in 2001. He was Vice President of Mission Operations and Support Services for the Lockheed Martin Corporation from 2004 to 2008. He is currently Vice President and JSC Program Manager for Exploration Systems at Orbital ATK, which was acquired by and renamed Northrop Grumman Innovation Systems in 2018.

== Personal life ==
Brian Duffy is married to the former Janet M. Helms of West Lafayette, Indiana, and they have two children.

== Organizations ==
- Air Force Association
- Association of Graduates, U.S. Air Force Academy
- Association of Space Explorers

== Awards and honors ==
- Distinguished Graduate of USAF Undergraduate Pilot Training Class 76-10 where he was awarded the UPT Flying Training Award
- Distinguished Graduate of USAF Test Pilot School Class 82B
- Distinguished Flying Cross
- Defense Meritorious Service Medal
- Defense Superior Service Medal
- Air Force Meritorious Service Medal
- Air Force Commendation Medal
- NASA Space Flight Medals (4)
- Inducted into United States Astronaut Hall of Fame, May 14, 2016
