= Hire, Nebraska =

Unincorporated community in Nebraska, U.S.

Coordinates: 42°10′28″N 101°25′06″W

Hire is an unincorporated community in Cherry County, Nebraska, United States.

== History ==
A post office was established at Hire in 1911, and remained in operation until it was discontinued in 1943. The community was named for John C. Hire, a pioneer settler.
