= Dominic L. Pudwill Gorie =

American astronaut (born 1957)

Dom Gorie
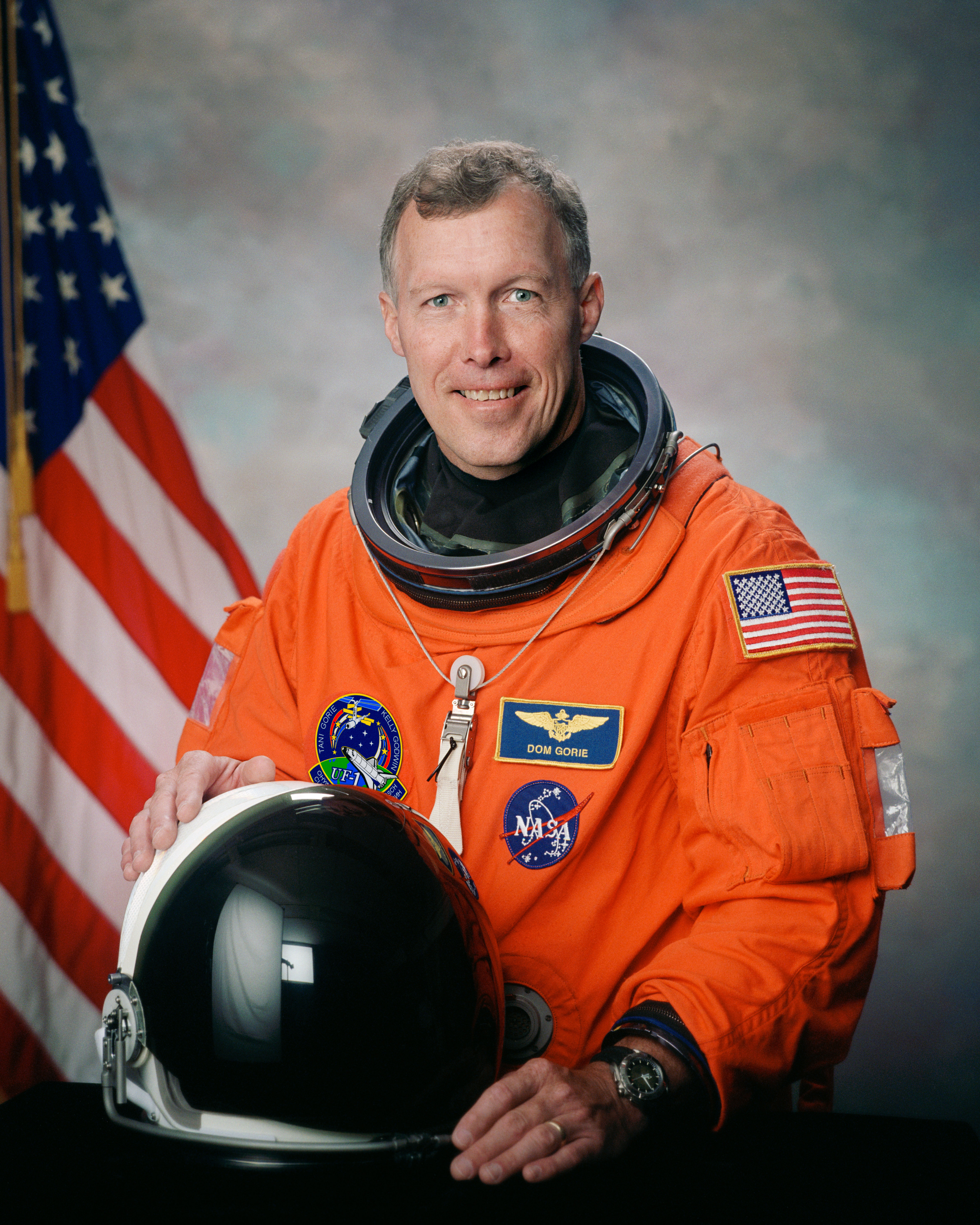
- Born: Dominic Lee Pudwill Gorie; May 2, 1957 (age 69); Lake Charles, Louisiana, U.S.
- Education: United States Naval Academy (BS); University of Tennessee, Tullahoma (MS)
- Space career

NASA astronaut
- Rank: Captain, USN
- Time in space: 49d 0h 6m
- Selection: NASA Group 15 (1994)
- Missions: STS-91; STS-99; STS-108; STS-123
- Mission insignia

Dominic Lee Pudwill Gorie (born May 2, 1957) is a retired United States Navy officer and NASA astronaut. He is a veteran of four Space Shuttle missions.

== Personal ==
Gorie was born in Lake Charles, Louisiana. His father, Capt. Paul Pudwill, was killed when the B-47 Stratojet he was flying developed ice on its wings and crashed; Dominic was six years old. He enrolled in the United States Naval Academy where he studied ocean engineering. Following graduation in 1979, he trained as a pilot and served tours of duty aboard the aircraft carriers USS America and USS Coral Sea. In 1987, he trained as a test pilot and worked at the Naval Air Test Center until the Gulf War, where, stationed aboard the carrier USS Theodore Roosevelt, he flew combat missions in Operation Desert Storm. He currently resides in Salida, Colorado.

== Education ==
Gorie graduated from Miami Palmetto High School in Pinecrest, Florida, in 1975. He then obtained his bachelor of science degree in ocean engineering from the United States Naval Academy in 1979, and his master of science degree in aviation systems from the University of Tennessee Space Institute in 1990.

== Awards and honors ==
=== Military ===
- Defense Superior Service Medal, Legion of Merit, Distinguished Flying Cross (2) one with Combat “V”, Air Medal (2), Defense Meritorious Service Medal, Navy Commendation Medal with Combat “V” (2)

=== NASA ===
- NASA Space Flight Medal (3)

=== Others ===
- National Wrestling Hall of Fame, 2017

== Military career ==
Designated a Naval Aviator in 1981. Flew the A-7E Corsair II with Attack Squadron 46 aboard USS America from 1981 to 1983. Transitioned to Strike Fighter Squadron 132 (VFA-132) in 1983, flying the F/A-18 Hornet aboard USS Coral Sea until 1986. Attended the U.S. Naval Test Pilot School in 1987 and served as a Test Pilot at the Naval Air Test Center from 1988 to 1990. Then was assigned to VFA-87 flying the F/A-18 aboard USS Theodore Roosevelt until 1992. He participated in Operation Desert Storm, flying 38 combat missions. In 1992 received orders to the U.S. Space Command in Colorado Springs, Colorado for two years before reporting to VFA-106 for F/A-18 refresher training. He was en route to his command tour of VFA-37 when he was selected as an astronaut candidate.

Gorie accumulated over 6,000 hours in more than 35 aircraft and has over 600 carrier landings.

Gorie retired from the U.S. Navy in September 2005.

== NASA career ==
In 1994, Gorie was selected as an astronaut candidate. He first flew as the pilot of mission STS-91 in 1998 and again as pilot on mission STS-99 in 2000. In 2001, Gorie was commander of mission STS-108, a visit to the International Space Station. In 2008, Gorie completed his 4th mission aboard a shuttle with STS-123.
