= James A. Pawelczyk =

American astronaut (born 1960)

James Anthony Pawelczyk
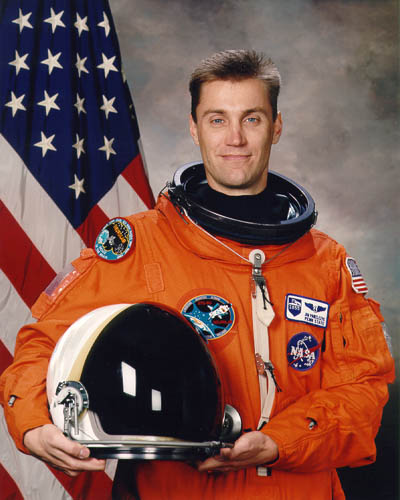
- Born: September 20, 1960 (age 66); Buffalo, New York
- Occupations: Professor, Researcher
- Space career

NASA Payload Specialist
- Time in space: 15d 21h 50m
- Missions: STS-90

James Anthony Pawelczyk (born September 20, 1960) is an American physiology and kinesiology researcher who flew aboard the NASA STS-90 Space Shuttle mission as a payload specialist.

== Family background ==
Pawelczyk was born in Buffalo, New York, although he considers Elma, New York, a suburb of Buffalo, as his hometown. He has two children, Katie and Brad. His hobbies include cycling, swimming, woodworking, philately, and outdoor activities. Pawelczyk is the first American astronaut of full-blooded Polish descent to go into space. (Polish Cosmonaut Mirosław Hermaszewski was the first Pole in space in 1978 when he flew aboard a Soyuz 30 spacecraft as part of a Soviet bloc program 'Interkosmos'.) In 1999, Pawelczyk and three other astronauts from the STS-90 crew were guests of State of the Republic of Poland. He presented the president with the Polish flag that flew with him aboard space shuttle, Columbia. His parents, Joe and Rita, along with representatives of the Polish American Congress from Buffalo and Chicago accompanied the crew on their visit.

== Education ==
Pawelczyk graduated from Iroquois Central High School, Elma, New York, in 1978. He went on to earn a BA degree in biology and a BA degree in psychology from the University of Rochester, New York, in 1982. Subsequently, he obtained a MS degree in physiology in 1985, and a PhD degree in biology (physiology) from the University of North Texas in 1989.

== Academic career ==
He conducted a post-doctoral fellowship in cardiovascular neurophysiology at the University of Texas Southwestern Medical Center between 1989 and 1992. Pawelczyk was also a visiting scientist at the Department of Anaesthesia of the Rigshospitalet in Copenhagen, Denmark, in 1990. Next, he became an assistant professor of medicine (cardiology) at the University of Texas Southwestern Medical Center from 1992 to 1995. Between 1992 and 1995, he was director of the Autonomic and Exercise Physiology Laboratories at the Institute for Exercise and Environmental Medicine of the Presbyterian Hospital of Dallas; in 1995, he was assistant professor of bioengineering at the University of Texas Southwestern Medical Center; since 1995, Pawelczyk is an associate professor of physiology and kinesiology at Penn State University, University Park, Pennsylvania. Pawelczyk took leave from Penn State University to fly as a payload specialist on STS-90 (Neurolab).

Pawelczyk is co-editor of Blood Loss and Shock, published in 1994. He has been a principal investigator or co-investigator on 11 federal and state grants and contracts, and has over 20 refereed journal articles and 3 invited book chapters in the areas of cardiovascular regulation and cardiovascular physiology.

== NASA career ==
User design group, GASMAP (Gas Analysis System for Metabolic Analysis Physiology); Unit principal investigator for the NASA Specialized Center for Outreach, Research and Training (NSCORT) grant in integrative physiology. He received a NASA Young Investigator Award in 1994 for his work in the area of autonomic neurophysiology. Pawelczyk was a co-investigator for experiments flown on the Neurolab mission, and two Shuttle-Mir (Phase 1B) flights. Pawelczyk served as a payload specialist on STS-90 Neurolab (April 17 to May 3, 1998). During the 16-day Spacelab flight the seven person crew aboard Space Shuttle Columbia served as both experiment subjects and operators for 26 individual life science experiments focusing on the effects of microgravity on the brain and nervous system. The STS-90 flight orbited the Earth 256 times, covered 6.3 million miles, and logged over 381 hours in space. Pawelczyk testified before the U.S. Senate Committee on Commerce, Science & Transportation in 2003. His testimony advocated strengthening research on board the International Space Station. He is a standing member of NASA's Life Sciences Advisory Subcommittee, and served as a member of the Research Maximization and Prioritization (ReMAP) Taskforce in 2002.

== Honors and awards ==
Research Scientist, United States Olympic Swimming Trials, 1984; Pre-doctoral training award, National Institutes of Health, 1988–1989; Research award, Texas Chapter of the American College of Sports Medicine, 1988; Post-doctoral training award, National Institutes of Health, 1989–1992; Young Investigator Award, Life Sciences Project Division, NASA Office of Life and Microgravity Science Applications, 1994, NASA Space Flight Medal (1998).
