= Jay C. Buckey =

American astronaut and physician (born 1956)

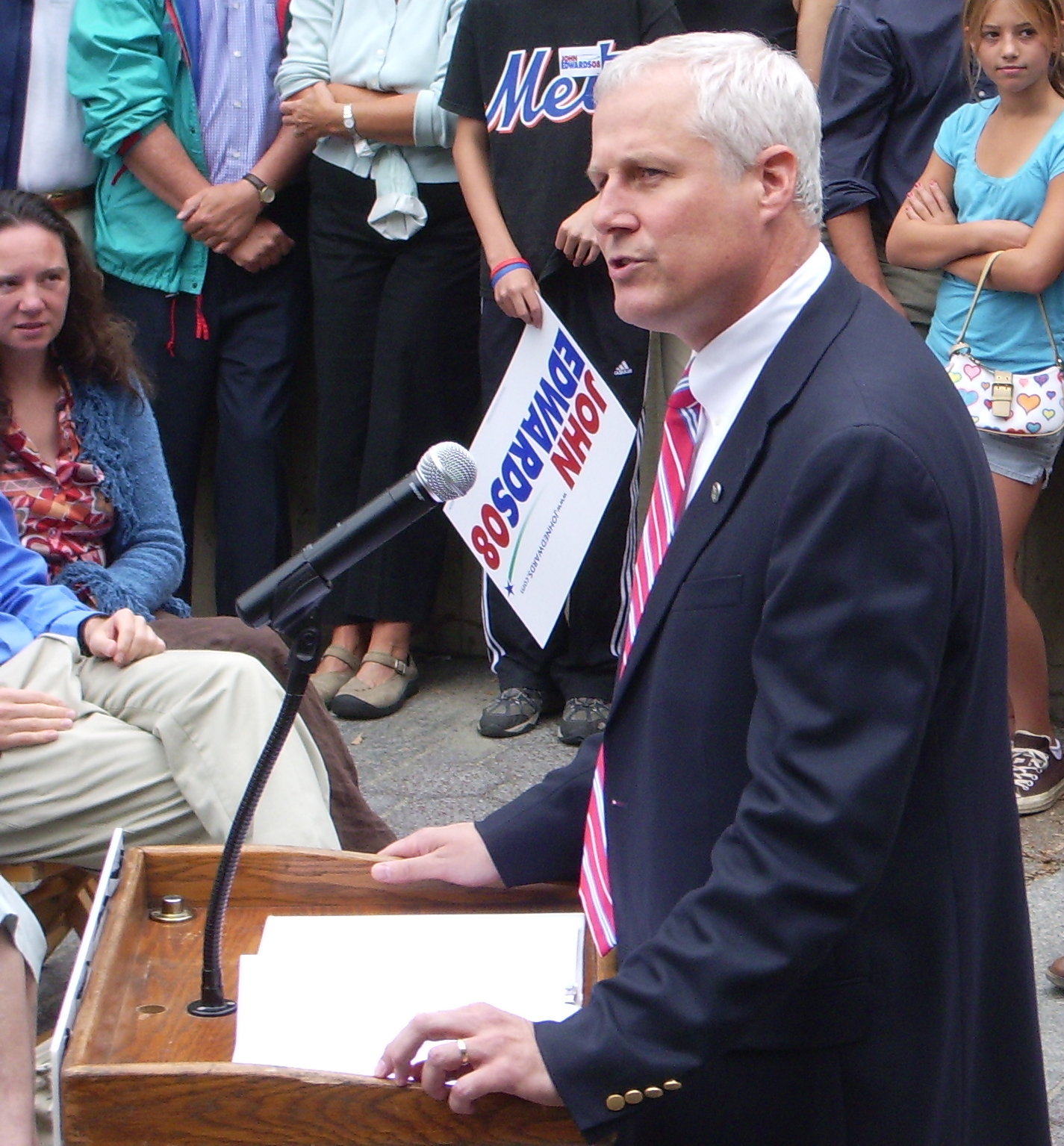
- Buckey in 2007
- Born: Jay Clark Buckey, Jr. June 6, 1956 (age 70); New York City, New York, U.S.
- Occupation: Medical Doctor
- Space career

Dartmouth Payload Specialist
- Time in space: 15d 21h 50m
- Missions: STS-90

Jay Clark Buckey Jr. (born June 6, 1956) is an American physician and astronaut who flew aboard one Space Shuttle mission (STS-90) as a Payload Specialist. Buckey briefly ran for the Democratic nomination to challenge New Hampshire Senator John E. Sununu, a first term Republican, when he was up for re-election in 2008. Buckey withdrew from the race when former Governor Jeanne Shaheen entered the race.

== Education ==
Buckey holds a Bachelor of Science degree in electrical engineering from Cornell University (1977) and an M.D. from Cornell in 1981, interning at New York Hospital-Cornell Medical Center and completing his residence at Dartmouth-Hitchcock Medical Center. Currently, Buckey is a Professor of Medicine at the Geisel School of Medicine. He was also a flight surgeon with the U.S. Air Force Reserve for 8 years.

== Spaceflight experience ==
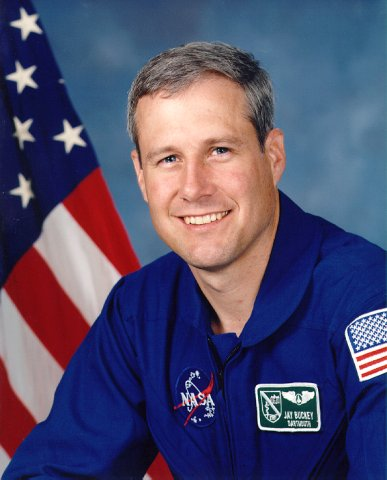
Astronaut Buckey

In 1998 he was a Payload Specialist aboard NASA Space Shuttle flight STS-90 as part of the Neurolab mission from April 17 to May 3, 1998. Aboard the Neurolab Mission, Buckey was the Payload Specialist for the experiment "Cardiovascular Adaptation to Zero-Gravity" and assisted with other Spacelab Life Sciences experiments. During the 16-day Spacelab flight, the seven person crew aboard Space Shuttle Columbia served as both experiment subjects and operators for 26 individual life science experiments focusing on the effects of microgravity on the brain and nervous system. The STS-90 flight orbited the Earth 256 times, covered 6.3 million miles, and logged him over 381 hours in space.

== Politics ==
Buckey initially entered the 2008 race for the Democratic Party's nomination to the United States Senate from New Hampshire to challenge Republican incumbent John E. Sununu, but withdrew upon the entry of former governor Jeanne Shaheen. Shaheen would ultimately defeat Sununu.

== Research ==
In 2018, Buckey was part of research using virtual reality, at the Australian Antarctic Division's Mawson Station, wherein the expeditioners used VR headsets to view Australian beach scenes, European nature scenes, and North American nature scenes of forests and urban environments, which were different from the isolation of the whiteness and silence of Antarctica. The research will inform psychological techniques to support long duration spaceflight such as for astronauts going to Mars.
