= Scott Altman =

American astronaut (born 1959)

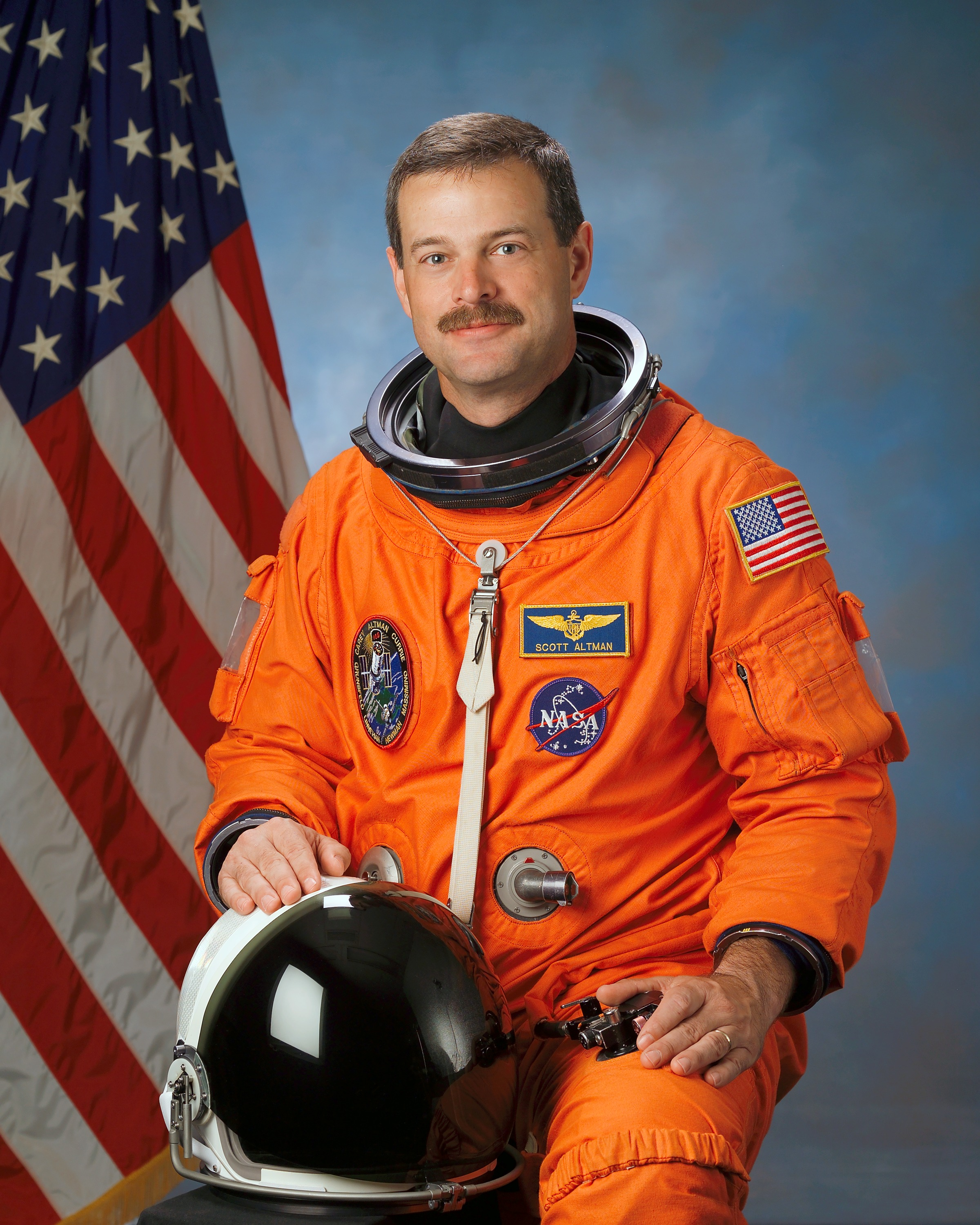
- Born: Scott Douglas Altman; August 15, 1959 (age 67); Lincoln, Illinois, U.S.
- Other name: Scooter
- Education: University of Illinois Urbana-Champaign (BS); Naval Postgraduate School (MS)
- Space career

NASA astronaut
- Rank: Captain, USN
- Time in space: 51d 12h 47m
- Selection: NASA Group 15 (1994)
- Missions: STS-90; STS-106; STS-109; STS-125

Scott Douglas "Scooter" Altman (born August 15, 1959) is a retired United States Navy Captain and naval aviator, engineer, test pilot and former NASA astronaut. He is a veteran of four Space Shuttle missions. His fourth mission on STS-125 was the last servicing mission to the Hubble Space Telescope. In 2018, he was inducted into the United States Astronaut Hall of Fame. As of November 2022, he is the president of the Space operating group for ASRC Federal.

== Personal life ==
Altman was born in Lincoln, Illinois. He is married to the former Jill Shannon Loomer of Tucson, Arizona and has three children, the second oldest of whom graduated Rice University in Houston, Texas in May 2009. He is a resident of Pekin, Illinois, along with his parents, Fred and Sharon Altman. The Pekin District 108 school board voted to honor the former astronaut by naming Scott Altman Primary School in 2010. Scott's sister Sarah Beardsley is the publisher of Venus Zine, a women's music, DIY and culture multi-media company. He is a brother of the Sigma Chi fraternity.

== Education ==
- 1977: Graduated from Pekin Community High School in Pekin, Illinois
- 1981: Received a Bachelor of Science degree in aeronautical and astronautical engineering from the University of Illinois Urbana-Champaign, where he became a member of the Sigma Chi fraternity
- 1990: Received a Master of Science degree in aeronautical engineering from the U.S. Naval Postgraduate School

== Military career ==
After being rejected from the United States Air Force for being too tall, Altman instead enlisted in the United States Navy. He was commissioned as an ensign in August 1981, and received his Naval Aviator wings in February 1983. As a member of Fighter Squadron 51 at (then) NAS Miramar, Altman completed two deployments to the Western Pacific and Indian Ocean flying the F-14A Tomcat from the USS Carl Vinson. In August 1987, he was selected for the Naval Postgraduate School-Test Pilot School Co-op program and graduated with Test Pilot School Class 97 in June 1990 as a Distinguished Graduate. After graduation, he spent the next two years as a test pilot working on various F-14 projects at Strike Aircraft Test Directorate NAWC AD Patuxent River Maryland. Altman then took the new F-14D on its first operational deployment with VF-31 Tomcatters, where he served as maintenance officer and later operations officer. He was awarded the Air Medal for his role as a strike leader flying over Southern Iraq in support of Operation Southern Watch. Shortly following his return from this six-month deployment, he was selected for the NASA astronaut program. He has logged over 7,000 flight hours in more than 40 types of aircraft. During his Navy service, Altman had the callsigns "Scooter" and "D-Bear".

=== Involvement in Top Gun film ===
Altman performed many of the aerial stunts in the 1986 film Top Gun, most notably in the scene where Tom Cruise's character, Maverick, "flips the bird" at the enemy MiG pilot (played by Robert F. Willard).

In a NASA interview prior to his 2000 spaceflight, Scott Altman commented on his role as an F-14 pilot involved in the filming of Top Gun:

Well, Top Gun was a real thrill. I still remember that so vividly. The word was going around town that Hollywood was coming to Miramar, where I was stationed, and they were going to do a movie, and we were all kind of excited. My squadron had just gotten back from a seven-and-a-half-month cruise about a week and a half before, so our airplanes were at home, we were available, we weren't too highly tasked. And it turned out they picked my squadron to supply the F-14s.

Then the skipper got together and tried to pick four guys that he thought, were mature enough, I guess, to handle, you know, the capability that they were being given in working with the movie, and all the things that were required. And the director wanted to have a small cadre of people that he could work with so you develop an understanding of what the movie folks want versus what we can do and how to try and balance those two requirements.

The flying was incredible. You know, most Navy pilots don't get to buzz the tower like in the movie – if you did you could just peel your wings off and, throw 'em at the door because you probably wouldn't be flying anymore – but, since it was Hollywood, you know, they wanted the scene. I had to buzz the tower. And, of course, they wanted nine different takes – so we did it nine times!

== NASA career ==
Selected as an astronaut candidate by NASA in December 1994, Altman reported to the Lyndon B. Johnson Space Center in March 1995. He completed a year of training and was initially assigned to work technical aspects of orbiter landing and roll out issues for the Astronaut Office Vehicle Systems Branch. He was the pilot on STS-90 (1998) and STS-106 (2000), and was the mission commander on STS-109 (2002) and STS-125 (2009). A veteran of four space flights, Altman has logged over 40 days in space. Altman retired from NASA in September 2010 to join ASRC Federal Research and Technology Solutions in Greenbelt, Maryland.

=== Spaceflights ===
STS-90 Neurolab (April 17 to May 3, 1998). During the 16-day Spacelab flight the seven person crew aboard Space Shuttle Columbia served as both experiment subjects and operators for 26 individual life science experiments focusing on the effects of microgravity on the brain and nervous system.

STS-106 Atlantis (September 8–20, 2000). During the 12-day mission, the crew successfully prepared the International Space Station for the arrival of the first permanent crew. Additionally, he handflew two complete flyarounds of the station after undocking.

STS-109 Columbia (March 1–12, 2002). STS-109 was the fourth Hubble Space Telescope (HST) servicing mission. The STS-109 crew successfully upgraded the Hubble Space Telescope leaving it with a new power unit, a new camera and new solar arrays. HST servicing and upgrade was accomplished by four crewmembers during a total of 5 EVAs in 5 consecutive days. The space walkers were assisted by crewmates inside Space Shuttle Columbia. STS-109 orbited the Earth 165 times, and covered 3.9 million miles in over 262 hours, culminating in a night landing at Kennedy Space Center, Florida.

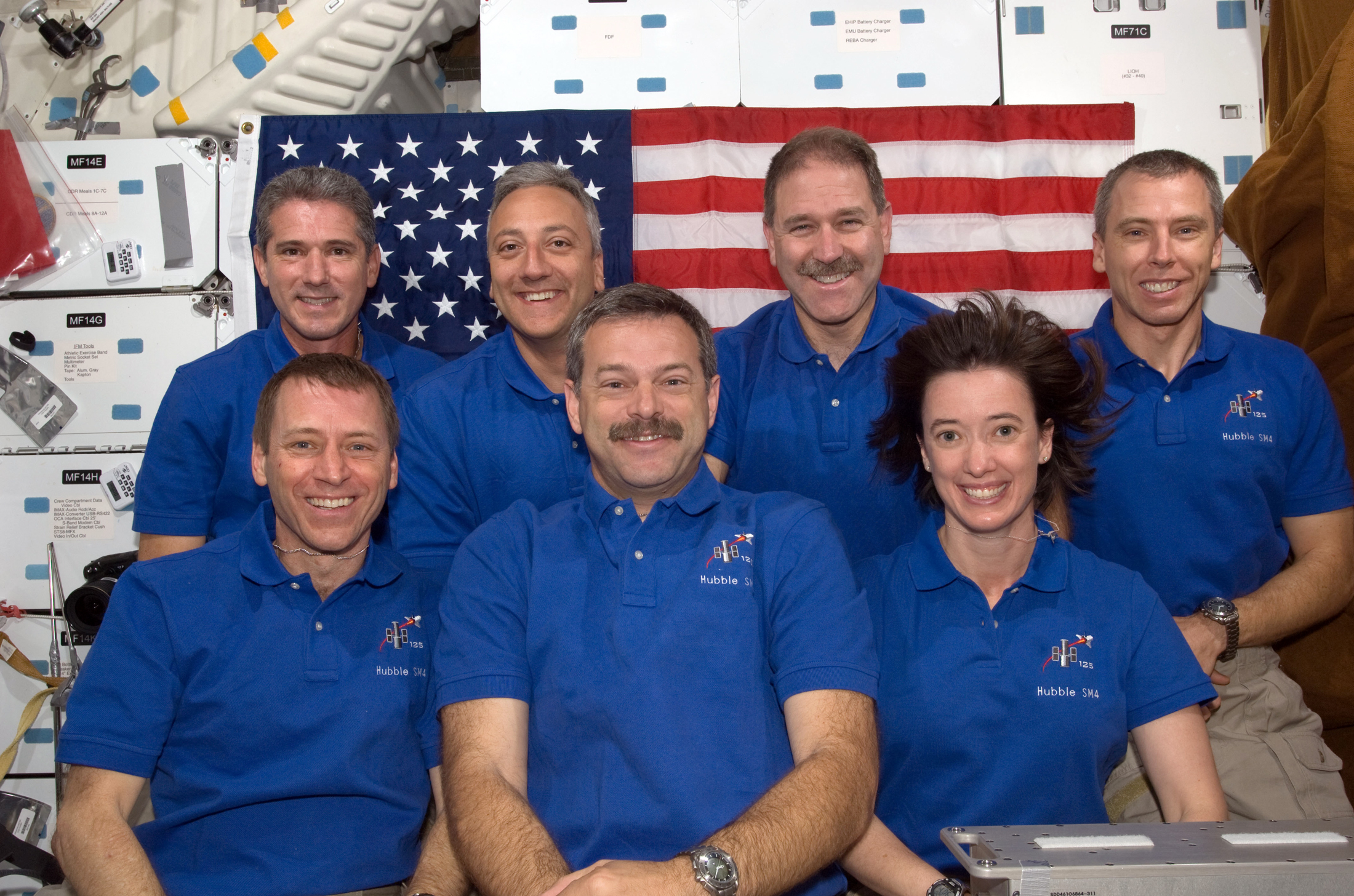
Altman (front center) with the crew of STS-125

STS-125 Atlantis (May 11–24, 2009). STS-125 was the fifth and final servicing mission to the Hubble Space Telescope. Atlantis carried two new instruments to the telescope, the Cosmic Origins Spectrograph and the Wide Field Camera 3. The mission also replaced a Fine Guidance Sensor, six gyroscopes, and two battery unit modules to allow the telescope to continue to function at least through 2014. The crew also installed new thermal blanket insulating panels to provide improved thermal protection, and a soft-capture mechanism that would aid in the safe de-orbiting of the telescope by an uncrewed spacecraft at the end of its operational lifespan. The mission also carried an IMAX camera and the crew documented the progress of the mission for an upcoming IMAX film.

== Organizations ==
- University of Illinois Alumni Association
- Sigma Chi Alumni Association
- Association of Naval Aviation life member
- Military Order of the World Wars

== Awards and honors ==
- Defense Superior Service Medal
- Legion of Merit
- Distinguished Flying Cross
- Defense Meritorious Service Medal
- Navy Strike/Flight Air Medal
- Navy Commendation Medal
- Navy Achievement Medal
- NASA Distinguished Service Medal
- 1987 Award winner for Outstanding Achievement in Tactical Aviation as selected by the Association of Naval Aviation.
- United States Astronaut Hall of Fame - 2018
- Awarded the Order of Lincoln, Illinois' highest honor, on November 6, 2021, at the awards presentation.
