= STS-90 =

1998 American crewed spaceflight and final flight of Spacelab

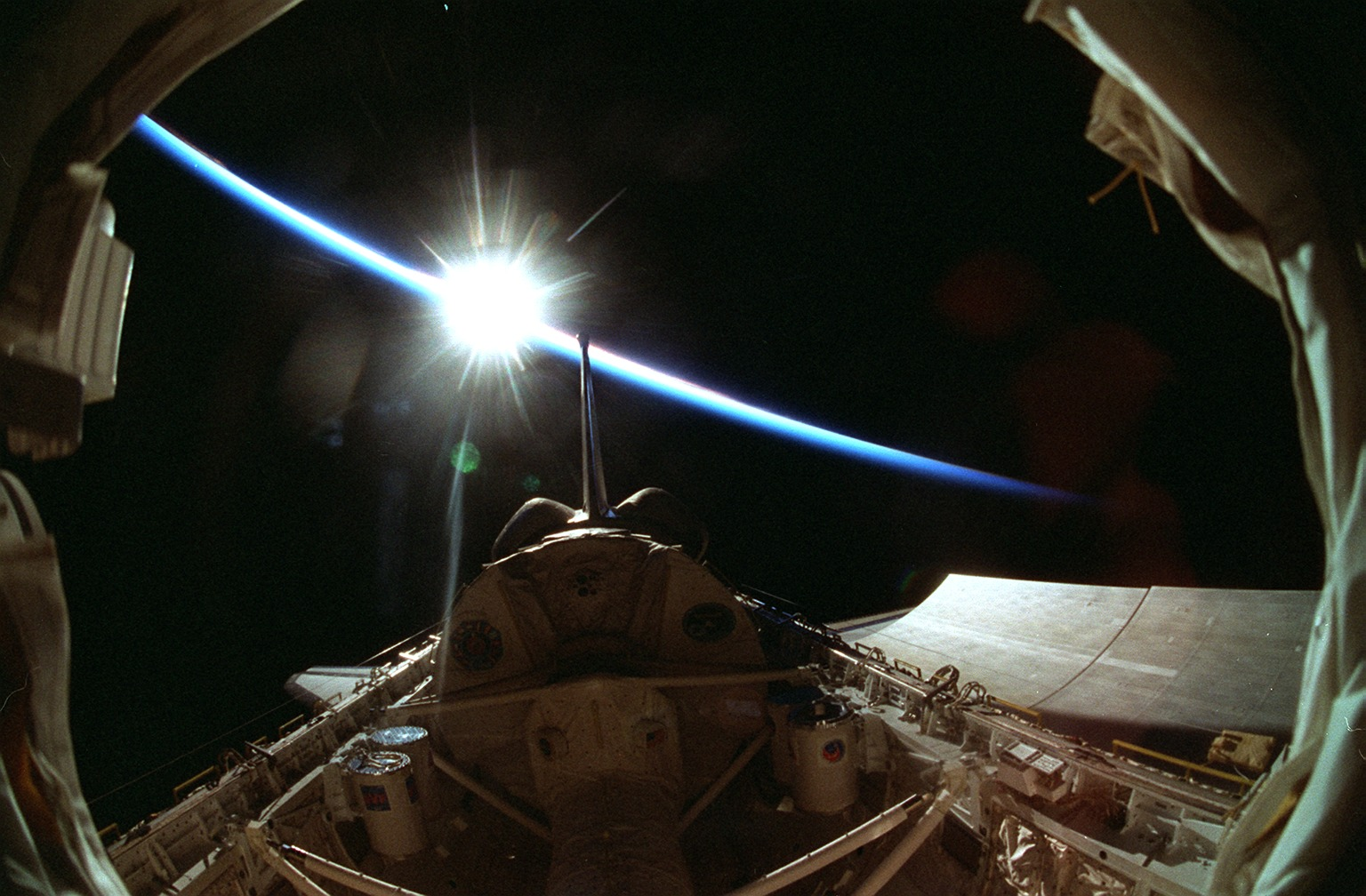
- Spacelab Module LM2 in Columbia's payload bay, serving as the Neurolab
- Names: Space Transportation System-90
- Mission type: Bioscience research
- Operator: NASA
- COSPAR ID: 1998-022A
- SATCAT no.: 25297
- Mission duration: 15 days, 21 hours, 50 minutes, 58 seconds
- Distance travelled: 10,000,000 kilometres (6,200,000 mi)

Spacecraft properties
- Spacecraft: Space Shuttle Columbia
- Landing mass: 105,462 kilograms (232,504 lb)
- Payload mass: 10,788 kilograms (23,783 lb)

Crew
- Crew size: 7
- Members: Richard A. Searfoss; Scott D. Altman; Dafydd Williams; Kathryn P. Hire; Richard M. Linnehan; Jay C. Buckey; James A. Pawelczyk

Start of mission
- Launch date: April 17, 1998, 18:19 UTC
- Launch site: Kennedy, LC-39B

End of mission
- Landing date: May 3, 1998, 16:09 UTC
- Landing site: Kennedy, SLF Runway 33

Orbital parameters
- Reference system: Geocentric
- Regime: Low Earth
- Perigee altitude: 247 kilometres (153 mi)
- Apogee altitude: 274 kilometres (170 mi)
- Inclination: 39.0 degrees
- Period: 89.7 min
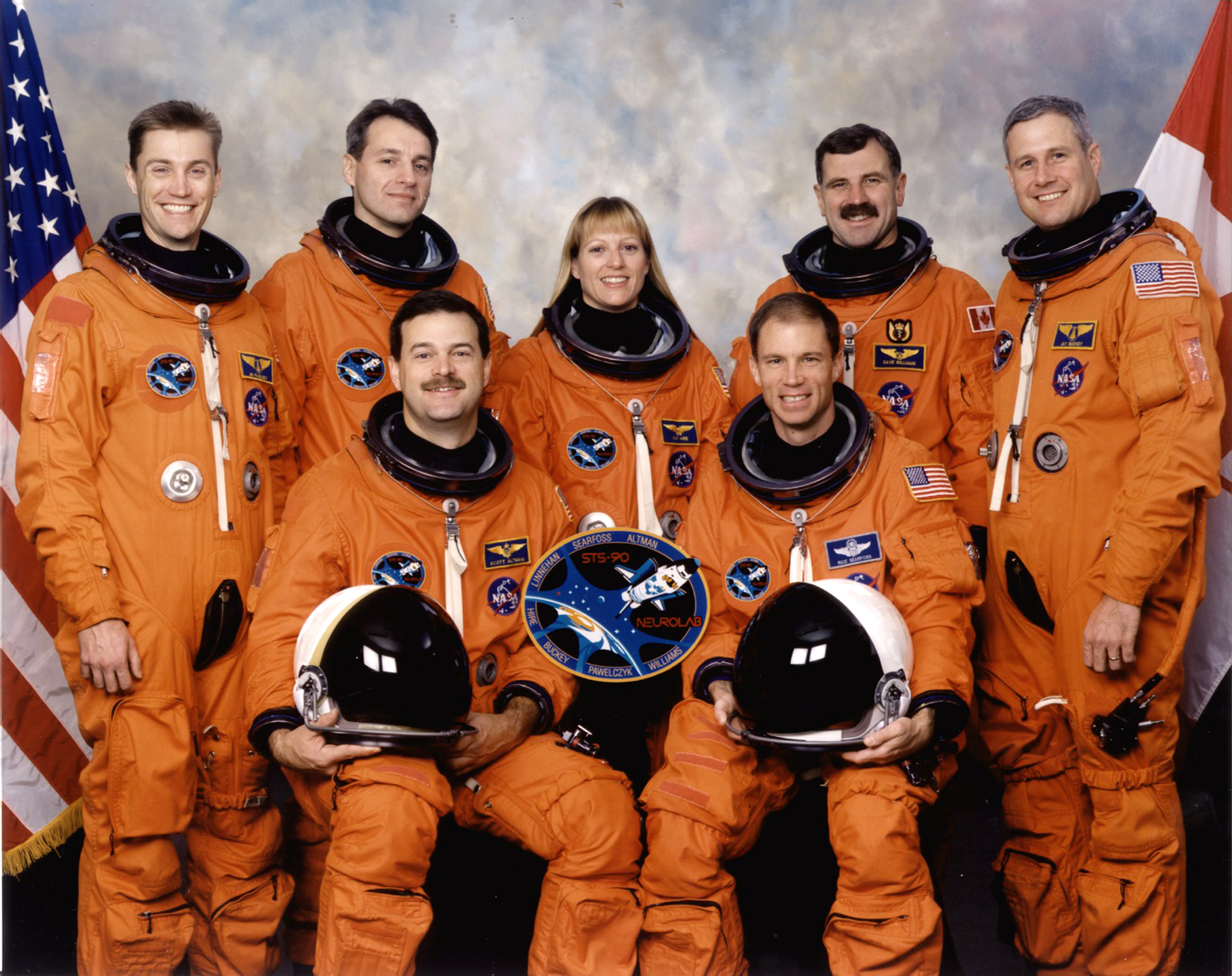
- Left to right – Front row: Altman, Searfoss; Back row: Pawelczyk, Linnehan, Hire, Williams, Buckey Space Shuttle program

STS-90 was a 1998 Space Shuttle mission flown by the Space Shuttle Columbia. The 16-day mission marked the last flight of the European Space Agency's Spacelab laboratory module, which had first flown on Columbia on STS-9, and was also the last daytime landing for Columbia.

== Crew ==
Position	Astronaut
Commander	(United States) Richard A. Searfoss; Third and last spaceflight
Pilot	(United States) Scott D. Altman; First spaceflight
Mission Specialist 1	(United States) Richard M. Linnehan; Second spaceflight
Mission Specialist 2 Flight Engineer	(United States) Kathryn P. Hire; First spaceflight
Mission Specialist 3	(Canada) Dafydd Williams, CSA; First spaceflight
Payload Specialist 1	(United States) Jay C. Buckey; Only spaceflight
Payload Specialist 2	(United States) James A. Pawelczyk; Only spaceflight

=== Backup crew ===
Position	Astronaut
Payload Specialist 1	(United States) Alexander W. Dunlap; First spaceflight
Payload Specialist 2	(Japan) Chiaki Mukai, JAXA; Second spaceflight

=== Crew seat assignments ===
Seat	Launch	Landing	Seats 1–4 are on the flight deck. Seats 5–7 are on the mid-deck.
1	Searfoss		Seats 1–4 are on the flight deck. Seats 5–7 are on the mid-deck.
2	Altman		Seats 1–4 are on the flight deck. Seats 5–7 are on the mid-deck.
3	Williams	Linnehan	Seats 1–4 are on the flight deck. Seats 5–7 are on the mid-deck.
4	Hire		Seats 1–4 are on the flight deck. Seats 5–7 are on the mid-deck.
5	Linnehan	Williams	Seats 1–4 are on the flight deck. Seats 5–7 are on the mid-deck.
6	Buckey		Seats 1–4 are on the flight deck. Seats 5–7 are on the mid-deck.
7	Pawelczyk		Seats 1–4 are on the flight deck. Seats 5–7 are on the mid-deck.

== Mission highlights ==
Attempt	Planned	Result	Turnaround	Reason	Decision point	Weather go (%)	Notes
1	16 Apr 1998, 2:19:00 pm	Scrubbed	—	Technical	16 Apr 1998, 8:15 am	100	Network signal processor problem.
2	17 Apr 1998, 2:19:00 pm	Success	1 day 0 hours 0 minutes			90	

Neurolab was a Spacelab module mission focusing on the effects of microgravity on the nervous system. The goals of Neurolab were to study basic research questions and to increase the understanding of the mechanisms responsible for neurological and behavioral changes in space. Specifically, experiments would study the adaptation of the vestibular system and space adaptation syndrome, the adaptation of the central nervous system and the pathways which control the ability to sense location in the absence of gravity, and the effect of microgravity on a developing nervous system. The science lead was Mary Anne Frey.

The mission was a joint venture of six space agencies and seven U.S. research agencies. Investigator teams from nine countries would conduct 31 studies in the microgravity environment of space. Other agencies participating in the mission included six institutes of the National Institutes of Health, the National Science Foundation, and the Office of Naval Research, as well as the space agencies of Canada, France, Germany, and Japan, and the European Space Agency.

Neurolab's 26 experiments targeted one of the most complex and least understood parts of the human body – the nervous system. Primary goals were to conduct basic research in neurosciences and expand understanding of how the nervous system develops and functions in space. Test subjects were rats, mice, crickets, snails, two kinds of fish and the crew members themselves. Cooperative effort of NASA, several domestic partners and the space agencies of Canada (CSA), France (CNES) and Germany (DLR), as well as the European Space Agency (ESA) and the National Space Development Agency of Japan (NASDA). Most experiments conducted in pressurized Spacelab long module located in Columbia's payload bay. This was the 16th and last scheduled flight of the ESA-developed Spacelab module although Spacelab pallets would continue to be used on the International Space Station.

Research conducted as planned, with the exception of the Mammalian Development Team, which had to reprioritize science activities because of the unexpected high mortality rate of neonatal rats on board.

Other payloads included the Shuttle Vibration Forces experiment, the Bioreactor Demonstration System-04, and three Get-Away Special (GAS) canister investigations.

STS-90 was the first mission to make an Orbital Maneuvering System (OMS) assist burn during the ascent.

Three of the seven STS-90 crew (Williams, Pawelczyk and Buckey) appeared on the Canadian television series Popular Mechanics for Kids. Working with engineers on the ground a week into the flight, the on-orbit crew used aluminum tape to bypass a suspect valve in the Regenerative Carbon Dioxide Removal System that had threatened to cut short the mission.

Mission Management Team considered, but decided against, extending the mission one day because the science community indicated an extended flight was not necessary and weather conditions were expected to deteriorate after planned landing on Sunday, May 3.

STS-90 Mission Specialist Kathryn Hire was Kennedy Space Center's first employee to be chosen as an astronaut candidate.

STS-90 was the second shuttle flight where a bat was observed landing on the External Tank (the first being STS-72), but it flew away just after main engine start. Another bat was observed landing on the External Tank during STS-119, but remained on the tank during liftoff.

== See also ==
- List of human spaceflights
- List of Space Shuttle missions
- Outline of space science
