= Kathryn P. Hire =

American astronaut and captain in the US Navy Reserve (born 1959)

Kay Hire
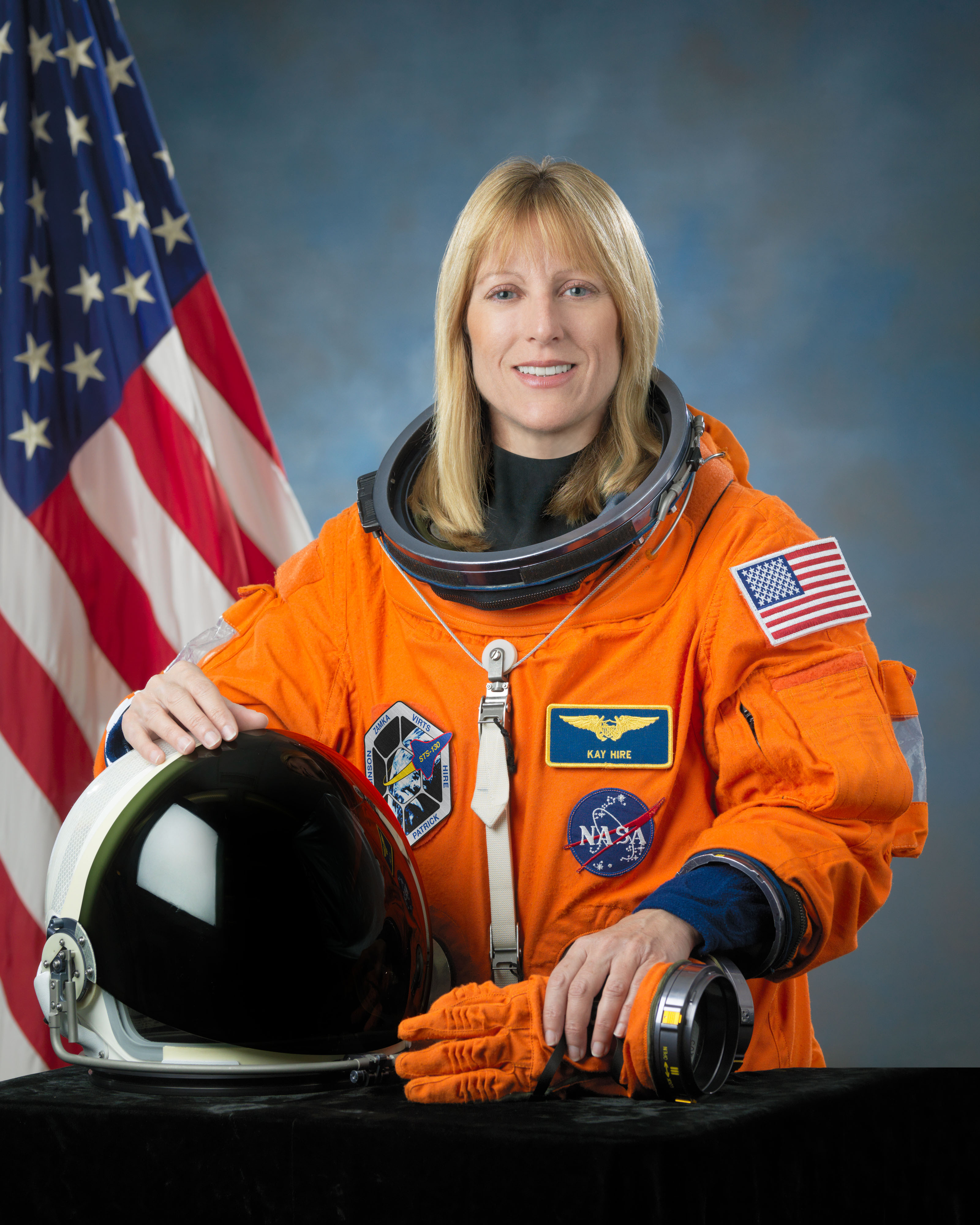
- Born: August 26, 1959 (age 67); Mobile, Alabama, U.S.
- Education: United States Naval Academy (BS); Florida Institute of Technology (MS)
- Space career

NASA astronaut
- Rank: Captain, USN
- Time in space: 29d 15h 59m
- Selection: NASA Group 15 (1994)
- Missions: STS-90; STS-130
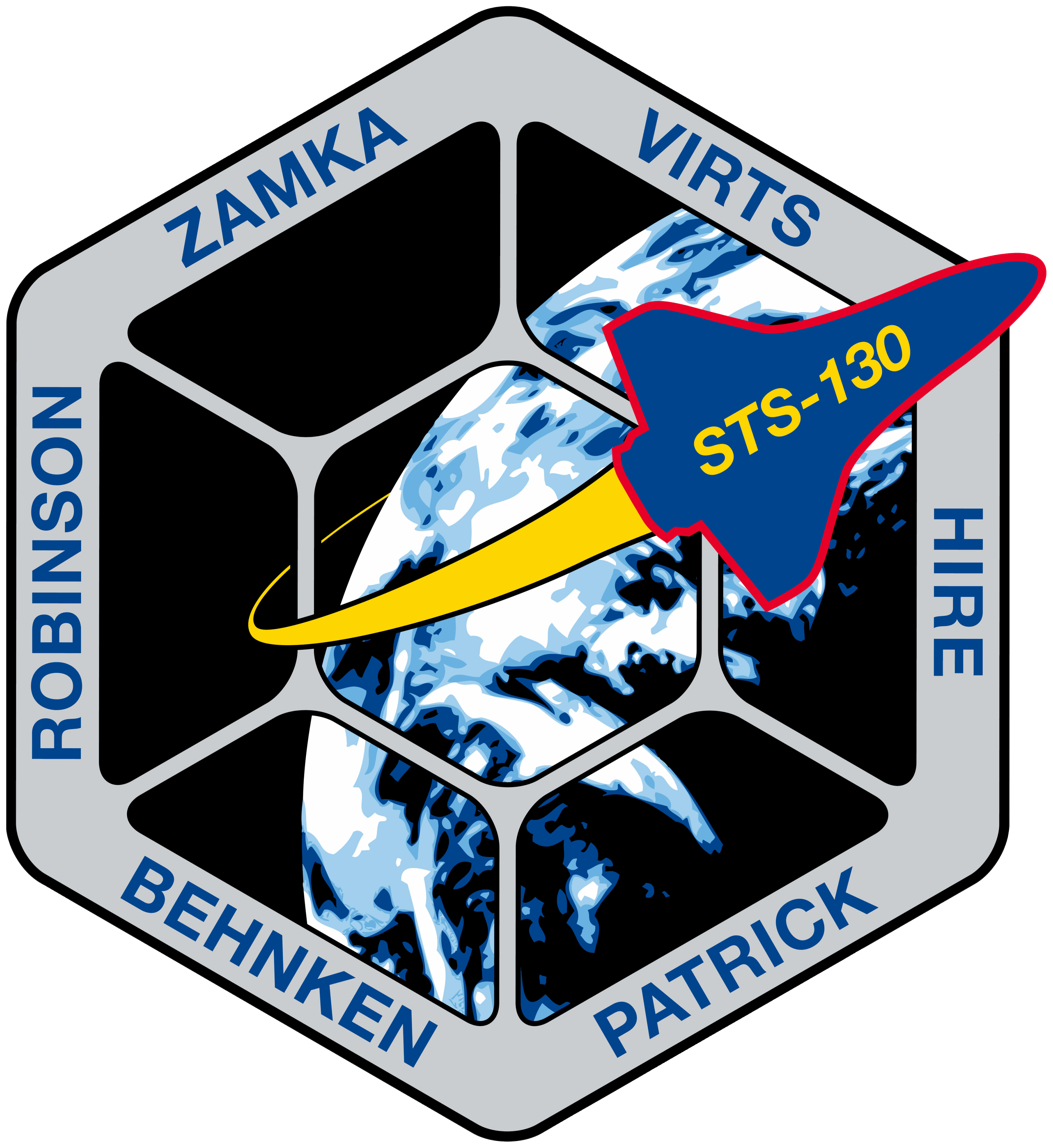
- Mission insignia

Kathryn Patricia "Kay" Hire (born August 26, 1959) is a former NASA astronaut and retired Captain in the U.S. Navy Reserve who has flown aboard two Space Shuttle missions.

== Education ==
Born in Mobile, Alabama, she attended St. Pius X Catholic Elementary School and Murphy High School. She received her Bachelor of Science degree in Engineering and Management from the United States Naval Academy in 1981 and her Master of Science degree in Space Technology from the Florida Institute of Technology in 1991.

== Experience ==
=== Navy experience ===
After earning her Naval Flight Officer wings in October 1982, Hire conducted worldwide airborne oceanographic research missions with Oceanographic Development Squadron Eight (VXN-8) based at NAS Patuxent River, Maryland. She flew as Oceanographic Project Coordinator, Mission Commander and Detachment Officer-in-Charge on board specially configured RP-3A and RP-3D Orion aircraft.

Hire later instructed student naval flight officers while assigned to Naval Air Training Unit Mather (NAVAIRTU Mather), a tenant command associated with the 323d Flying Training Wing at Mather Air Force Base, California. While assigned to NAVAIRTU Mather, Hire progressed from Navigation Instructor and Course Manager to Curriculum Manager while concurrently assigned as a navigator flight instructor in the USAF T-43A aircraft.

In January 1989, Hire resigned her Regular Navy commission and left active duty, accepting a Reserve commission and joining the Naval Reserve at NAS Jacksonville, Florida. Her initial tours of duty included Patrol Squadron Augment Unit VP-0545 and Anti-Submarine Warfare Operations Center 0574 and 0374.

Following the repeal of the Title 10 U.S.C. combat aircraft restriction for female military aviators in 1993, Hire was the first female in the U.S. military assigned to a combat aircrew, reporting to Patrol Squadron Sixty-Two (VP-62) on May 13, 1993, as a Navigator/Communicator flying the P-3C Update III Orion maritime patrol aircraft. VP-62 was also based at NAS Jacksonville and Hire routinely deployed for flight operations throughout the North Atlantic, Europe, and the Caribbean.

Hire later served with USS Kitty Hawk Detachment 0482, Tactical Support Center 0682, U.S. Seventh Fleet Detachment 111, and U.S. Naval Forces Central Command Detachment 108. Recalled to full-time active military duty from 2001 to 2003, Hire supported Operation Enduring Freedom and Operation Iraqi Freedom as a member of the Headquarters, U.S. Central Command Current Operations and Joint Operations Center (JOC) staffs at MacDill AFB, Florida during Operation Enduring Freedom, followed by reassignment to the U.S. Naval Forces Central Command/U.S. Fifth Fleet staff for Operation Iraqi Freedom. She was promoted to her current rank of captain in the U.S. Navy on December 1, 2002.

=== NASA experience ===
Hire began work at the Kennedy Space Center in May 1989, first as an Orbiter Processing Facility 3 Activation Engineer and later as a Space Shuttle Orbiter Mechanical Systems Engineer for Lockheed Space Operations Company. In 1991 she was certified as a Space Shuttle Test Project Engineer (TPE) and headed the checkout of the Extravehicular Mobility Units (spacesuits) and Russian Orbiter Docking System. She was assigned as Supervisor of Space Shuttle Orbiter Mechanisms and Launch Pad Swing Arms in 1994.

Selected by NASA in December 1994, Hire reported to the Johnson Space Center in March 1995. After a year of training, she worked in mission control as a spacecraft communicator (CAPCOM). Hire flew as Mission Specialist-2 on STS-90 Neurolab (1998) and logged over 381 hours in space. She served as the Astronaut Office Lead for Shuttle Avionics Integration Laboratory (SAIL), Shuttle Payloads, and Flight Crew Equipment. Hire was assigned to the Astronaut Support Personnel (ASP) team for Kennedy Space Center Operations. She then journeyed to the International Space Station as a mission specialist for Space Shuttle mission STS-130.

=== Space flight experience ===
STS-90 Neurolab (April 17 – May 3, 1998). During the 16-day Spacelab flight, the seven-member crew aboard Space Shuttle Columbia served as both experimental subjects and operators for 26 life science experiments focusing on the effects of microgravity on the brain and nervous system. The STS-90 flight orbited the Earth 256 times and covered 6.3 million miles.

STS-130 (February 8, 2010 – February 21, 2010) She also journeyed to the International Space Station as a mission specialist for Space Shuttle mission STS-130.

As of June 2018, Hire was considered a "NASA Management Astronaut", which meant that she was employed at NASA but was no longer eligible for spaceflight assignments.

On February 28, 2019, Hire retired from NASA.

== Organizations ==
- Association of Space Explorers
- Association of Naval Aviation
- Institute of Navigation
- Naval Reserve Association
- U.S. Naval Academy Alumni Association
- U.S. Sailing Association

== Special honors ==
- Defense Superior Service Medal
- Meritorious Service Medal (3)
- Joint Service Commendation Medal
- Navy and Marine Corps Commendation Medal
- National Defense Service Medal (2)
- Armed Forces Expeditionary Medal
- War on Terrorism Service Medal
- Armed Forces Reserve Medal with bronze "M" Device and silver Hourglass Device
- NASA Space Flight Medal
