= NASA Space Flight Medal =

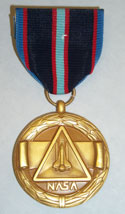
- Type: Medal
- Awarded for: "significant achievement or service during individual participation as a civilian or military astronaut, pilot, mission specialist, payload specialist, or other space flight participant in a space flight mission."
- Country: United States
- Presented by: the National Aeronautics and Space Administration
- Eligibility: astronaut flight crew members
- Status: Active
- First award: 1981
- NASA Space Flight Ribbon

Precedence
- Next (higher): Exceptional Public Service Medal

The NASA Space Flight Medal is a decoration of the National Aeronautics and Space Administration. According to its statutes, it is awarded "for significant achievement or service during individual participation as a civilian or military astronaut, pilot, mission specialist, payload specialist, or other space flight participant in a space flight mission." In practice, the medal is bestowed upon any astronaut (US or foreign) who flies aboard a United States space mission, and typically every subsequent flight is honored with an additional award.

Multiple awards of the decoration are annotated either by award stars or oak leaf clusters (depending on the civilian or military status of the recipient and, if military, the branch of service). The NASA Space Flight Medal is also authorized for wear on active uniforms of the United States military and is worn after all military decorations.

For those who perform an act of gallantry or heroic action while engaged in a U.S. space mission, NASA also presents an award known as the Congressional Space Medal of Honor. This is separate award from the Medal of Honor which is a U.S. military decoration for extreme bravery.

== See also ==
- List of NASA awards
