= Bruce E. Melnick =

American astronaut (born 1949)

Bruce Melnick
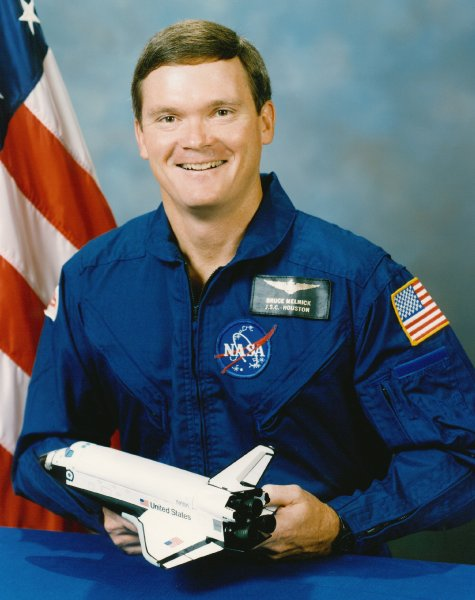
- Born: Bruce Edward Melnick; December 5, 1949 (age 76); New York City, New York, U.S.
- Education: Georgia Institute of Technology; United States Coast Guard Academy (BS); University of West Florida (MS)
- Space career

NASA astronaut
- Rank: Commander, USCG
- Time in space: 12d 23h 27m
- Selection: NASA Group 12 (1987)
- Missions: STS-41; STS-49

Bruce Edward Melnick (born December 5, 1949) is a retired American astronaut and United States Coast Guard officer. Following retirement from NASA and the Coast Guard, he entered the aerospace industry. He served as a vice president with the Boeing Co.'s Integrated Defense Systems group, in charge of Boeing's Florida operations at the John F. Kennedy Space Center (KSC). Melnick retired in 2008 and currently resides on Merritt Island, Florida.

== Early life and education ==
Melnick was born December 5, 1949, in New York City, New York, but considers Clearwater, Florida, to be his hometown. He graduated from Clearwater High School, Clearwater, Florida, in 1967. He attended Georgia Institute of Technology for a year, and then went on to receive a Bachelor of Science degree with honors in Engineering from the United States Coast Guard Academy in 1972, and a Master of Science degree in Aeronautical Systems from the University of West Florida in 1975. He was awarded an honorary Doctorate of Science degree from the University of West Florida on 28 April 2001.

== Coast Guard career ==
Melnick spent 20 years in the United States Coast Guard, rising to the rank of commander. His assignments included serving as operations officer and chief test pilot at the Coast Guard Aircraft Program Office in Grand Prairie, Texas. In that capacity, he conducted most of the developmental and all of the acceptance test flights for the HH-65 Dolphin helicopter, including sea trials, and wrote the HH-65 flight manual.

During his Coast Guard service, Melnick received numerous awards, including two Defense Distinguished Service Medals, two Distinguished Flying Crosses and the Secretary of Transportation Heroism Award.

In 1992, he received the U.S. Coast Guard Academy Distinguished Alumni Award. He logged over 5,000 hours flying time, predominantly in the HH-3F Pelican, HH-52 Sea Guard, HH-65 Dolphin, and T-38 Talon aircraft. Melnick retired from the U.S. Coast Guard and left NASA in July 1992.

== NASA career ==
Melnick was selected by NASA in 1987. He was the first Coast Guard aviator to participate in the space program and was the first Coast Guard aviator into space. Commander Melnick retired from the U.S. Coast Guard and left NASA in July 1992.

=== STS-41 ===
Melnick served as a mission specialist during STS-41. Discovery launched from LC-39B, on October 6, 1990, at 11:47:15 UTC. The primary goal of the mission was to deploy the Ulysses spacecraft in partnership with the European Space Agency (ESA), which observed the Sun's activity across different latitudes.

The Inertial Upper Stage (IUS), combined with the Payload Assist Module (PAM-S), propelled Ulysses towards Jupiter for a gravity assist, slingshotting the spacecraft to its out-of-ecliptic orbit for solar observations. Additionally, STS-41 conducted experiments like the Shuttle Solar Backscatter Ultraviolet Instrument (SSBUV), which studied Earth's upper atmosphere, investigations into polymer membrane production (IPMP), Chromosome and Plant Cell Division in Space (CHROMEX), and more.

The STS-41 mission concluded with the successful landing of Discovery at Edwards Air Force Base, Runway 22, on October 10, 1990, at 13:57:19 UTC.

=== STS-49 ===
Melnick once again served as a mission specialist during STS-49. On May 7, 1992, 23:40:00 UTC, Endeavour launched from LC-39B on its maiden flight.

The primary mission objective involved a series of spacewalks aimed at capturing and repairing the stranded Intelsat VI satellite. Multiple spacewalks were conducted to retrieve, repair, and redeploy the satellite. The mission featured the first three-person spacewalk, which was an unplanned solution to challenges encountered during the satellite capture. These spacewalks showcased technical proficiency in orbital servicing and repair and set a record for the longest-duration spacewalks at the time.

STS-49 concluded with the safe landing of Endeavour at the Edwards Air Force Base, Runway 22 on May 16, 1992, at 20:57:38 UTC.

== Aerospace-industry career ==
Melnick was the vice president for Boeing Florida operations at the John F. Kennedy Space Center. Melnick's organization, a part of the Boeing Integrated Defense Systems group, provides a variety of support services to Boeing programs in the state. Headquartered in Titusville, Florida, the organization has approximately 2,400 employees. Services provided by Boeing in Florida include engineering, facilities and maintenance support to NASA and the Department of Defense for the Space Shuttle, International Space Station and Delta rocket programs. Melnick was also responsible for the pursuit of new business for the company in Florida.

Melnick was formerly the Boeing Company vice president, also at the space center, for the payload ground operations contract with NASA, with 1,600 employees. The contract included all the engineering and facilities support and maintenance activities related to preparing spacecraft and/or payloads for the space shuttle missions prior to launch and after landing. The division also provided support to NASA and its contractors for the International Space Station hardware.

Prior to joining Boeing (McDonnell Douglas at the time), Melnick was vice president/director for shuttle engineering at United Space Alliance, formerly Lockheed Martin Space Operations, from 1994 to 1996. From 1992 to 1994, he was director of process improvement technology at Lockheed Space Operations Company.

== Affiliations ==
Memberships:

- USCG Academy Alumni Association
- USCG Ancient Order of the Pterodactyl
- USCG Aviation Hall of Fame
- American Institute of Aeronautics and Astronautics
- Association of Space Explorers
- Coastal Conservation Association
- Early and Pioneer Naval Aviators
- Florida Sport Fishing Association
- Missile, Space & Range Pioneers
- National Management Association
- Naval Aviation Museum Foundation
- North American Hunters Club
- United States Space Foundation
- Civilian Military Council

Boards of directors:

- Astronaut Memorial Planetarium
- Crosswinds Youth Services, Inc.
- National Space Club
- Florida Space Research Institute
- Florida Space Authority
- Economic Development Commission
- Space Coast Cystic Fibrosis Foundation

Board of governors:

- Brevard Community College Foundation

Boards of advisors:

- University of Central Florida, College of Engineering
- Florida Institute of Technology, College of Business
- University of West Florida, Institute for Interdisciplinary
- Embry Riddle Aeronautical University, Aeronautical Engineering
- Study of Human and Machine Cognition
