= William W. Parsons (NASA) =

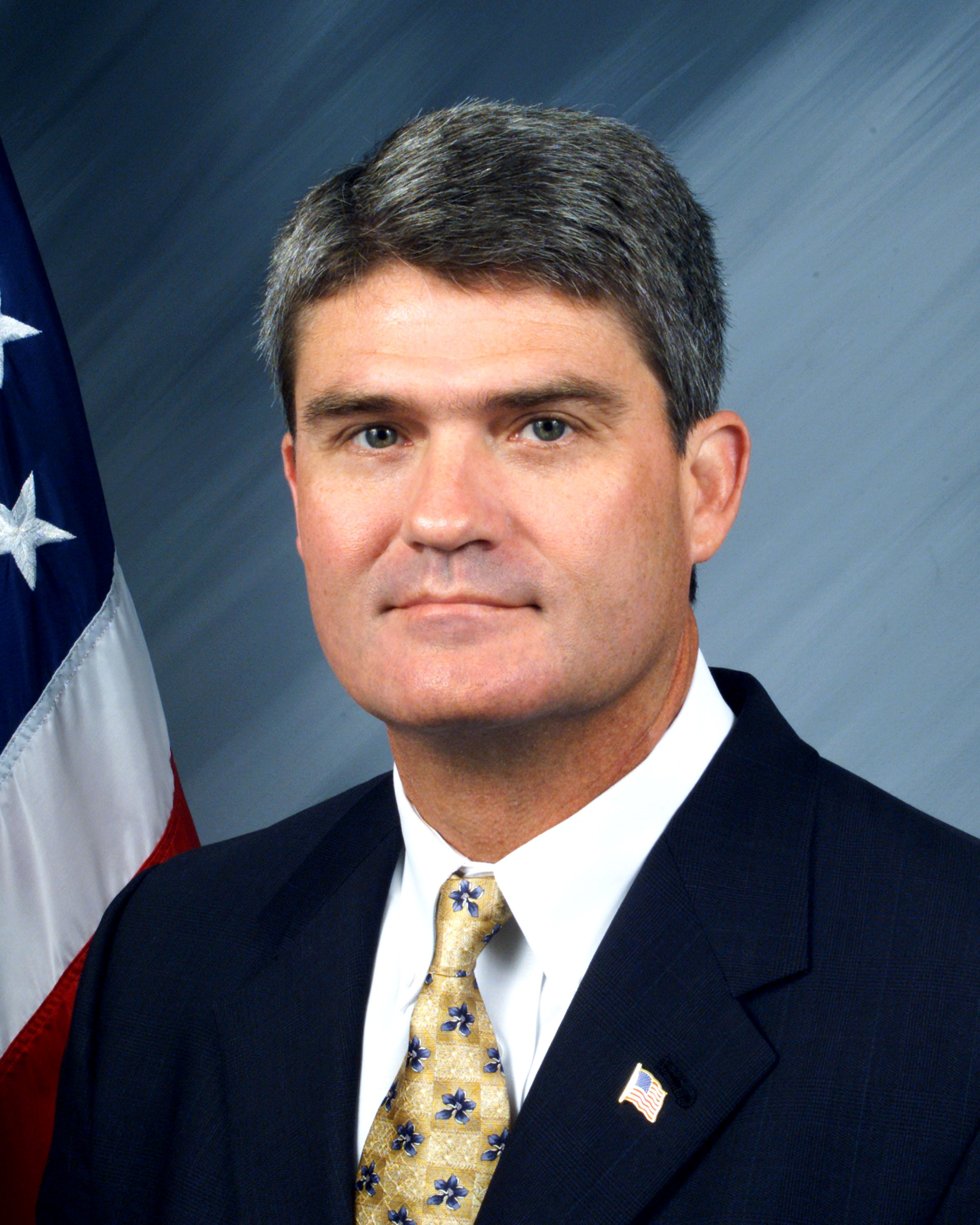

9th Director of the Kennedy Space Center
- In office January 4, 2007 – October 26, 2008
- President: George W. Bush
- Preceded by: James W. Kennedy
- Succeeded by: Robert D. Cabana

5th and 7th Director of the Stennis Space Center
- In office September 2005 – February 2006
- President: George W. Bush
- Preceded by: Thomas Q. Donaldson
- Succeeded by: Richard Gilbrech
- In office August 2002 – May 2003
- President: George W. Bush
- Preceded by: Roy Estess
- Succeeded by: Thomas Q. Donaldson

Space Shuttle Program Manager
- In office May 2003 – September 2005
- President: George W. Bush
- Preceded by: Ronald D. Dittemore
- Succeeded by: N. Wayne Hale Jr.

Personal details
- Born: United States
- Education: University of Mississippi; University of Central Florida
- Profession: Engineer

William W. (Bill) Parsons is an American engineer. He served as the ninth director of NASA's John F. Kennedy Space Center, and as the fifth and seventh director of NASA's John C. Stennis Space Center.

Parsons served as Space Shuttle Program Manager from 2003 to 2005, and was instrumental in the Space Shuttle's return to flight in 2005 following the Space Shuttle Columbia disaster.

== Career ==
=== NASA ===
Parsons joined the NASA team in 1990 at the Kennedy Space Center as a launch site support manager in the Shuttle Operations Directorate. In 1997, he was assigned to Stennis Space Center as the chief of operations of the Propulsion Test Directorate. Parsons relocated to NASA's Johnson Space Center in Houston to become the director of the Center Operations Directorate. He later served as the deputy director. In 2001, he returned to Stennis and served as director of the Center Operations and Support Directorate. His first stint as Stennis center director came in August 2002.

He was appointed as Space Shuttle Program manager in 2003 to lead the return-to-flight activities for the agency and played a major role in the success of the Discovery STS-114 mission. He then returned to Stennis to assume the duties of center director again and to lead hurricane recovery efforts at Stennis and the Michoud Assembly Facility in New Orleans.

=== Post-NASA ===
After leaving NASA, Parson would be hired as the vice-president of Peraton's Human Space Programs.

== Personal life ==
Parsons holds a bachelor's degree in engineering from the University of Mississippi, and a master's degree in engineering management from the University of Central Florida.

He resides in Sanford, Florida.
