= Robert D. Cabana =

American astronaut (born 1949)

Robert Cabana
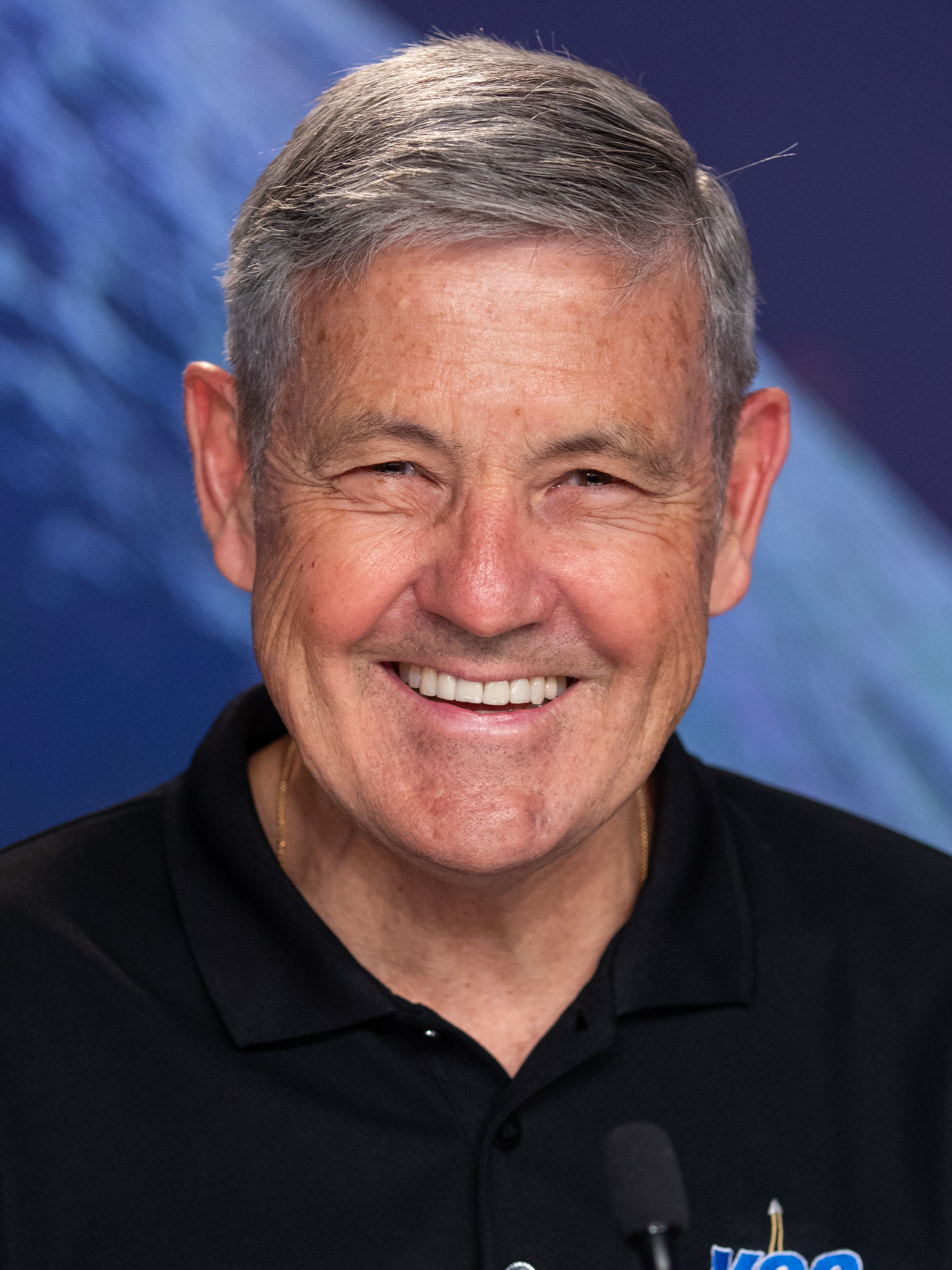
- Cabana in 2023

Associate Administrator of the National Aeronautics and Space Administration
- In office May 17, 2021 – December 31, 2023
- President: Joe Biden
- Preceded by: Steve Jurczyk
- Succeeded by: James Free

10th Director of the Kennedy Space Center
- In office October 26, 2008 – May 17, 2021
- President: George W. Bush; Barack Obama; Donald Trump; Joe Biden
- Preceded by: William Parsons
- Succeeded by: Janet Petro

Personal details
- Born: January 23, 1949 (age 77) Minneapolis, Minnesota, U.S.
- Education: United States Naval Academy (BS)
- Awards: Distinguished Flying Cross; NASA Distinguished Service Medal
- Space career

NASA astronaut
- Rank: Colonel, USMC
- Time in space: 37d 22h 42min
- Selection: NASA Group 11 (1985)
- Missions: STS-41, STS-53, STS-65, STS-88
- Retired: December 31, 2023

Robert Donald Cabana (born January 23, 1949) is an American retired astronaut and civil servant. He served as Chief of the Astronaut Office from 1994 to 1997 and as director of the John F. Kennedy Space Center from 2008 to 2021, and was then appointed Associate Administrator of the National Aeronautics and Space Administration. He is also a former naval flight officer and naval aviator in the United States Marine Corps.

== Personal ==
Robert Donald Cabana was born January 23, 1949, in Minneapolis, Minnesota, to Ted and Annabell Cabana. Robert is the older of two sons. His younger brother is Gary Cabana. He has three children.

== Education ==
Cabana graduated from Washburn High School, Minneapolis, Minnesota, in 1967. He received his Bachelor of Science degree in mathematics from the United States Naval Academy, Annapolis, Maryland, in 1971.

== Military career ==
After graduation from the United States Naval Academy, Cabana attended The Basic School at Marine Corps Base Quantico, Virginia, and completed Naval Flight Officer training at Naval Air Station Pensacola, Florida, in 1972. He served as an A-6 Intruder bombardier/navigator with squadrons in the 2nd Marine Aircraft Wing (2nd MAW) at Marine Corps Air Station Cherry Point, North Carolina, and the 1st Marine Aircraft Wing at Marine Corps Air Station Iwakuni, Japan. He returned to NAS Pensacola in 1975 for pilot training and was redesignated as a naval aviator in September 1976. He was then assigned to the 2nd MAW at MCAS Cherry Point, where he flew A-6 Intruders. He graduated from the United States Naval Test Pilot School in 1981, and served at the Naval Air Test Center at NAS Patuxent River, Maryland, as the A-6 program manager, X-29 advanced technology demonstrator project officer, and as a test pilot for flight systems and ordnance separation testing on A-6 Intruder and A-4 Skyhawk series aircraft. Prior to his selection as an astronaut candidate, he was serving as the assistant operations officer of Marine Aircraft Group 12 at MCAS Iwakuni, Japan.

Cabana retired from the Marine Corps in August 2000 in the rank of colonel.

He has logged over 8,000 hours in over 50 different kinds of aircraft.

== NASA career ==
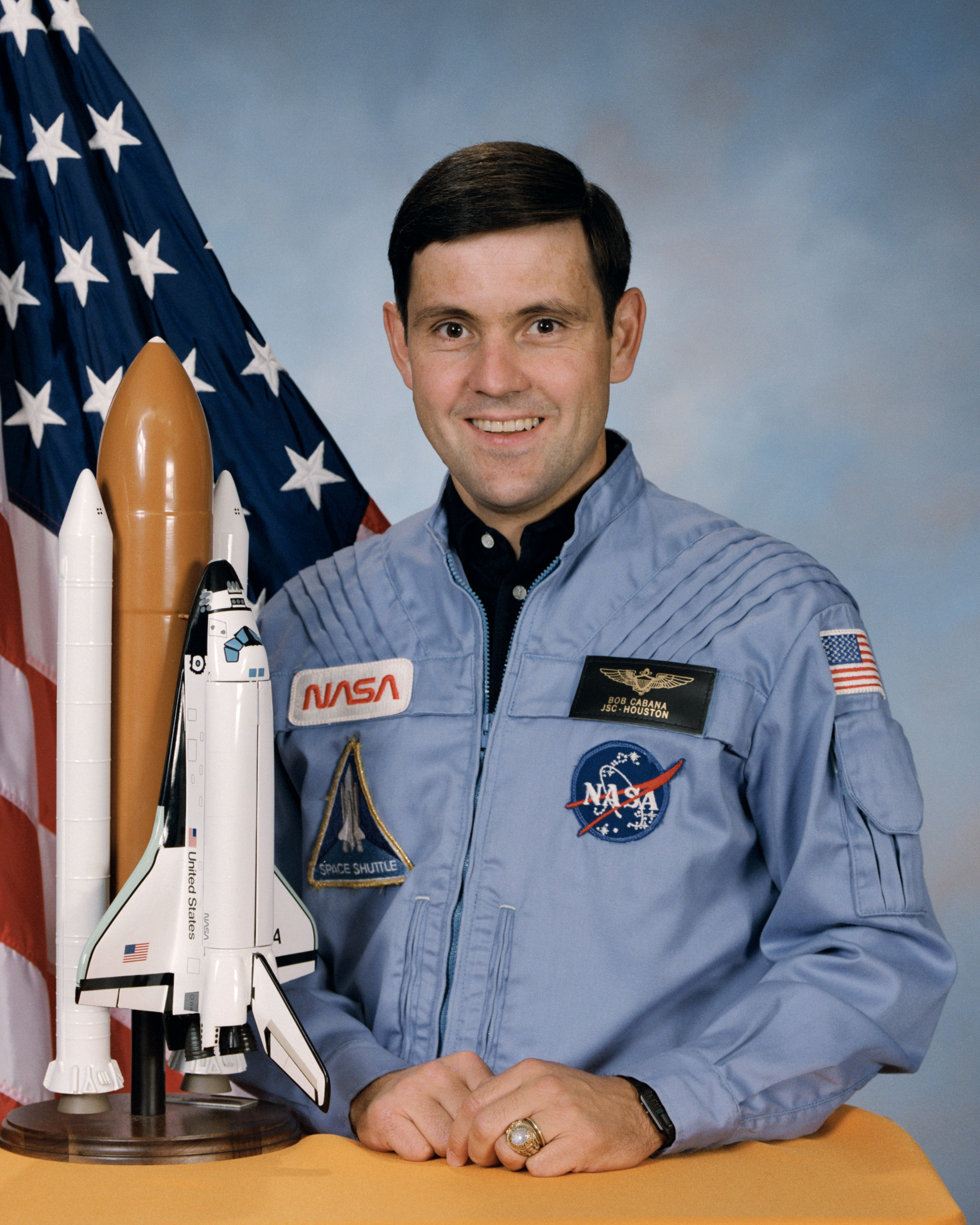
Cabana in 1985

Selected by NASA as an astronaut candidate in June 1985, Cabana completed initial astronaut training in July 1986, qualifying for assignment as a pilot on future Space Shuttle flight crews. His initial assignment was as the Astronaut Office Space Shuttle flight software coordinator until November 1986. At that time he was assigned as the deputy chief of aircraft operations for the Johnson Space Center where he served for 2 1/2 years. He then served as the lead astronaut in the Shuttle Avionics Integration Laboratory (SAIL) where the Orbiter's flight software is tested prior to flight. Cabana has served as a spacecraft communicator (CAPCOM) in Mission Control during Space Shuttle missions, and as chief of astronaut appearances. Prior to his assignment to command STS-88, Cabana served three years as NASA's Chief of the Astronaut Office.

Following STS-88, Cabana served as the deputy director of flight crew operations. After joining the ISS Program in October 1999, Cabana served as manager for international operations. From August 2001 to September 2002, he served as director of Human Space Flight Programs, Russia. As NASA's lead representative to the Russian Aviation and Space Agency (Rosaviakosmos) and its contractors, he provided oversight of all human space flight operations, logistics, and technical functions, including NASA's mission operations in Korolev and crew training at the Gagarin Cosmonaut Training Center in Star City, Russia.

Upon his return to Houston, Cabana was assigned briefly as the deputy manager of International Space Station (ISS) Program. From November 2002 to March 2004, he served as director of Flight Crew Operations Directorate, responsible for directing the day-to-day activities of the directorate, including the NASA Astronaut Corps and aircraft operations at Ellington Field. He was then assigned as deputy director of the Johnson Space Center, where he served for three and a half years. From October 2007 through October 2008, Cabana served as director of John C. Stennis Space Center.

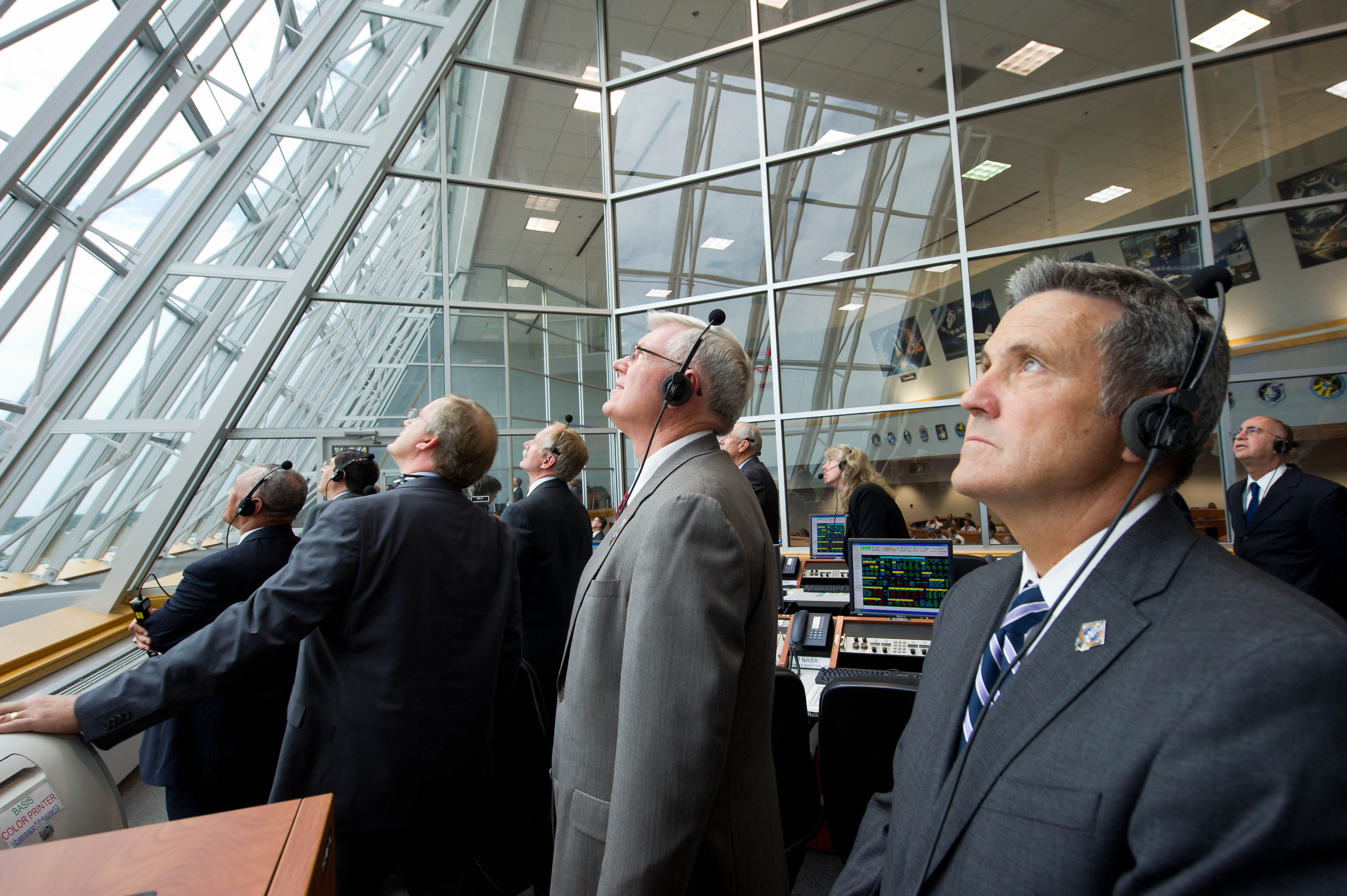
Robert Cabana in Firing Room Four observing the last mission of the Space Shuttle

In October 2008 he was reassigned as director of the John F. Kennedy Space Center, and served as director for over a decade.

In May 2021, Cabana was appointed as the Associate Administrator of NASA. As a former active astronaut still employed by NASA, Cabana remained a member of the NASA Astronaut Corps as a non-flight eligible management astronauts. Cabana retired from NASA on December 31, 2023.

== Spaceflight experience ==
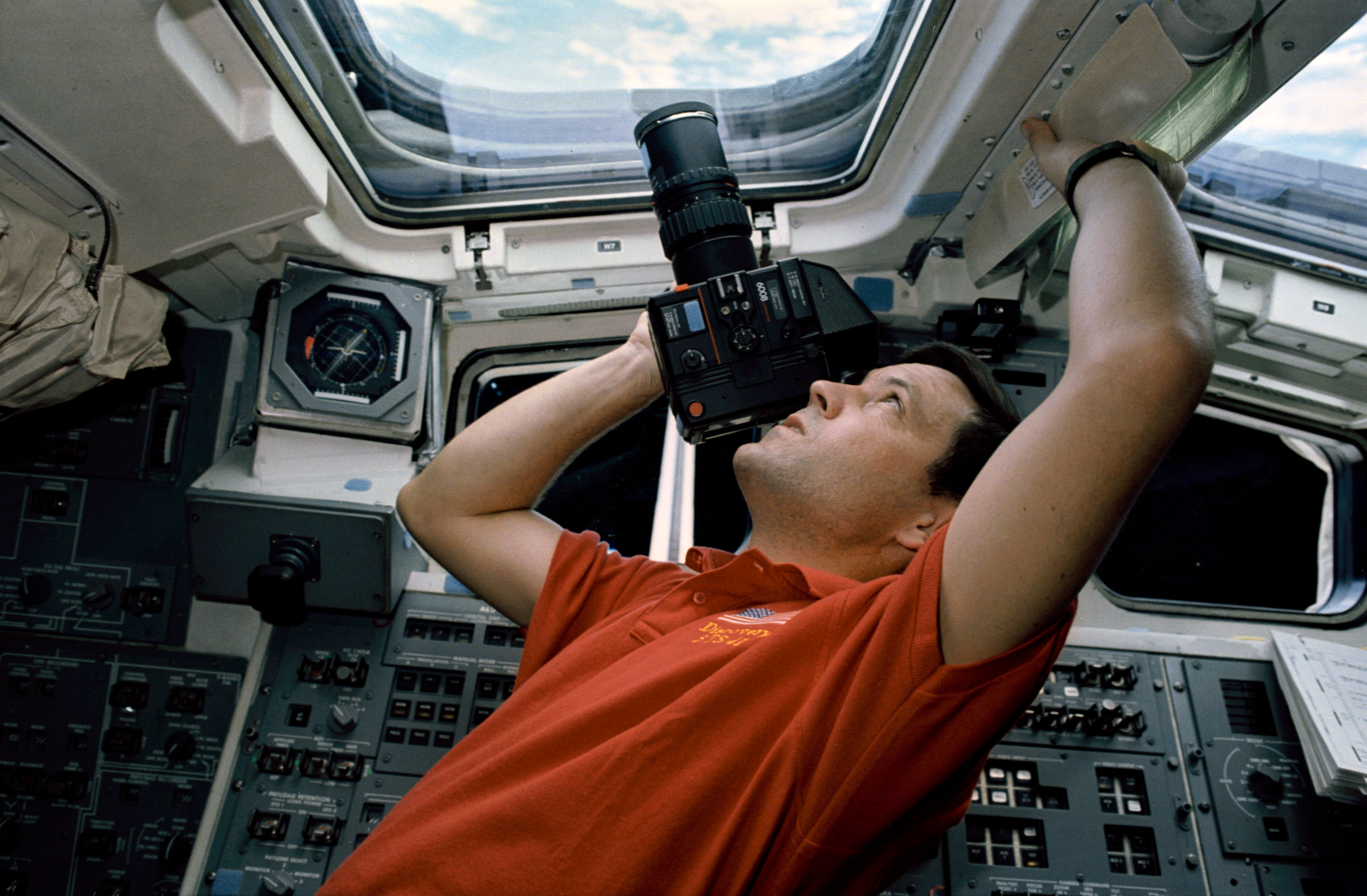
Pilot Cabana uses a Rolleiflex 6008 during STS-41

STS-41 Discovery launched on October 6, 1990, from the Kennedy Space Center, Florida, and landed at Edwards Air Force Base, California, on October 10, 1990. During 66 orbits of the Earth, the five-man crew successfully deployed the Ulysses spacecraft, starting the interplanetary probe on its four-year journey, via Jupiter, to investigate the polar regions of the Sun; operated the Shuttle Solar Backscatter Ultraviolet instrument (SSBUV) to map atmospheric ozone levels; activated a controlled "fire in space" experiment (the Solid Surface Combustion Experiment, or SSCE); and conducted numerous other middeck experiments involving radiation measurements, polymer membrane production, and microgravity effects on plants.

STS-53 Discovery launched from the Kennedy Space Center, Florida, on December 2, 1992. The crew of five deployed the classified Department of Defense payload DOD-1 and then performed several Military-Man-in-Space and NASA experiments. After completing 115 orbits of the Earth in 175 hours, Discovery landed at Edwards Air Force Base, California, on December 9, 1992.

STS-65 Columbia launched from the Kennedy Space Center, Florida, on July 8, 1994, returning to Florida on July 23, 1994. The crew conducted the second International Microgravity Laboratory (IML-2) mission utilizing the long Spacelab module in the payload bay. The flight consisted of 82 experiments from 15 countries and six space agencies from around the world. During the record-setting 15-day flight, the crew conducted experiments that focused on materials and life sciences research in a microgravity environment paving the way for future operations and cooperation aboard International Space Station. The mission was accomplished in 236 orbits of the Earth in 353 hours and 55 minutes.

STS-88 Endeavour (December 4–15, 1998) was the first International Space Station assembly mission. During the 12-day mission, Unity, the U.S. built node, was attached to Zarya, the Russian built Functional Cargo Block (FGB). Two crewmembers performed three spacewalks to connect umbilicals and attach tools/hardware in the assembly and outfitting of the station. Additionally, the crew performed the initial activation and first ingress of the International Space Station preparing it for future assembly missions and full-time occupation. The crew also performed IMAX Cargo Bay Camera (ICBC) operations, and deployed two satellites, Mighty Sat 1 built by the U.S. Air Force's Phillips Laboratory, and SAC-A, the first successful launch of an Argentine satellite. The mission was accomplished in 185 orbits of the Earth in 283 hours and 18 minutes.

Cabana has logged over 910 hours in space.

== Organizations ==
- Member of the Association of Space Explorers
- Fellow in the Society of Experimental Test Pilots
- Fellow in the American Institute of Aeronautics and Astronautics

== Awards and honors ==
- Defense Superior Service Medal
- Distinguished Flying Cross
- Defense Meritorious Service Medal
- Meritorious Service Medal
- National Intelligence Medal of Achievement
- NASA Distinguished Service Medal
- two NASA Outstanding Leadership Medals
- two NASA Exceptional Service Medals
- four NASA Space Flight Medals
- Recipient of The Daughters of the American Revolution Award for the top Marine to complete naval flight training (1976)
- Distinguished Graduate, U.S. Naval Test Pilot School
- De la Vaulx Medal by the Fédération Aéronautique Internationale (1994)
- Astronaut Hall of Fame (May 2008).

== Footnotes ==
| Preceded by Robert L. Gibson | Chief of the Astronaut Office; 1994–1997 | Succeeded by Kenneth Cockrell |
