= Stennis Space Center =

NASA rocket engine testing facility in Mississippi

Coordinates: 30°21′45.96″N 89°36′00.72″W

John C. Stennis Space Center

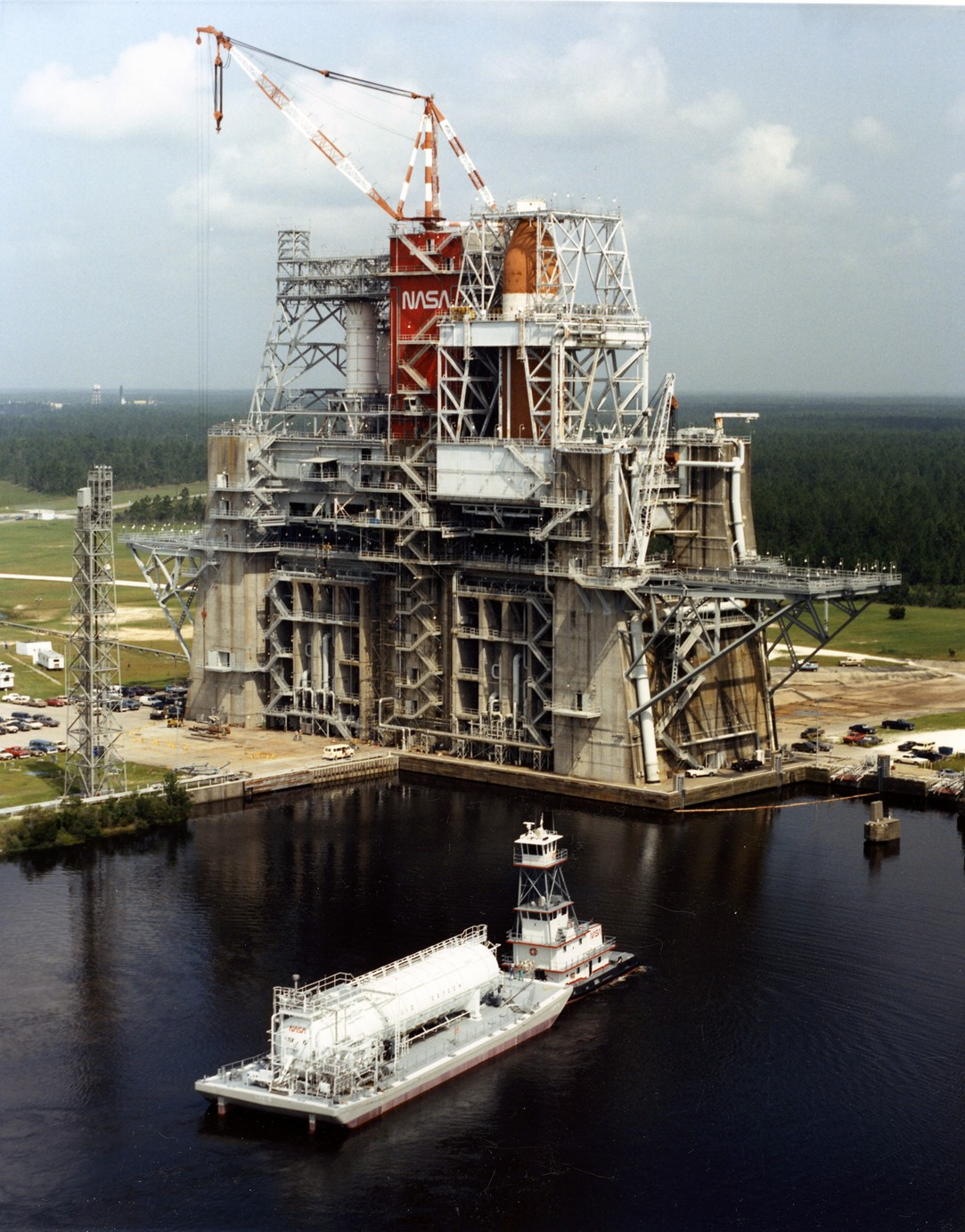
- The B-1/B-2 Test Stand holding Space Shuttle components (1987)

Agency overview
- Formed: 1961
- Preceding agencies: Mississippi Test Operations; National Space Technology Laboratories
- Jurisdiction: U.S. federal government
- Headquarters: Hancock County, Mississippi, United States
- Agency executive: Christine Powell, director
- Parent agency: NASA
- Website: nasa.gov/stennis

The John C. Stennis Space Center (SSC) is a NASA rocket testing facility in Hancock County, Mississippi, United States, on the banks of the Pearl River at the Mississippi–Louisiana border. As of 2012, it is NASA's largest rocket engine test facility. There are over 50 local, state, national, international, private, and public companies and agencies using SSC for their rocket testing facilities.

== History ==
The initial requirements for NASA's proposed rocket testing facility required the site to be located between the rockets' manufacturing facility at Michoud Assembly Facility in eastern New Orleans, Louisiana, and the launch facility at the Kennedy Space Center in Florida. Also, the site required barge access as the rocket stages to be tested for Apollo were too large for overland transport. Additionally, the Apollo motors were too loud to be tested at Marshall Space Flight Center's existing test stands near Huntsville, Alabama. A more isolated site was needed.

After an exhaustive site selection process that included reviews of other coastal locations including Eglin Air Force Base in Florida plus islands in both the Caribbean and the Pacific, NASA announced formation of the Mississippi Test Facility (now known as Stennis Space Center) on Oct. 25, 1961, for testing engines for the Apollo Program. A high-terrace area bordering the East Pearl River in Hancock County, Miss., was selected for its location. NASA entrusted the U.S. Army Corps of Engineers with the difficult task to procure each land parcel either by directly purchasing the land or through acquisition of a perpetual easement.

The selected area was thinly populated and met all other requirements; however before construction began, five small communities (Gainesville, Logtown, Napoleon, Santa Rosa, and Westonia), plus the northern portion of a sixth (Pearlington), and a combined population of 700 families had to be completely relocated off the facility. The effort acquired more than 3,200 parcels of privately owned land – 786 residences, 16 churches, 19 stores, three schools and a wide assortment of commercial buildings, including nightclubs and community centers. Remnants of the communities, including city streets and a one-room school house, still exist within the facility.

The 13,500 acres (55 km^{2}) site was selected on October 25, 1961, on the Mississippi Test Facility or Pearl River Site. On December 18, 1961, NASA officially designated the facility as NASA Mississippi Test Operations. The test area (officially known as the Fee Area) is surrounded by a 125,000 acre (506 km^{2}) acoustical buffer zone. The facility's large concrete and metal rocket propulsion test stands were originally used to test-fire the first and second stages of the Saturn V rockets. The facility was renamed again to Mississippi Test Facility on July 1, 1965, became a part of the Marshall Space Flight Center.

Starting in 1971, all Space Shuttle Main Engines were flight-certified at Stennis. On June 14, 1974, the site was renamed National Space Technology Laboratories, a name that continued until May 20, 1988, when it was renamed for Mississippi senator and space program supporter John C. Stennis.

With the end of the Apollo and Shuttle programs, use of the base decreased, with economic impact to the surrounding communities. Over the years, other government organizations and commercial entities have moved to and left from the facility, in the balance providing a major economic benefit to the communities.

== Rocket propulsion test complex ==
- Rocket Propulsion Test Complex
- U.S. National Register of Historic Places
- U.S. National Historic Landmark
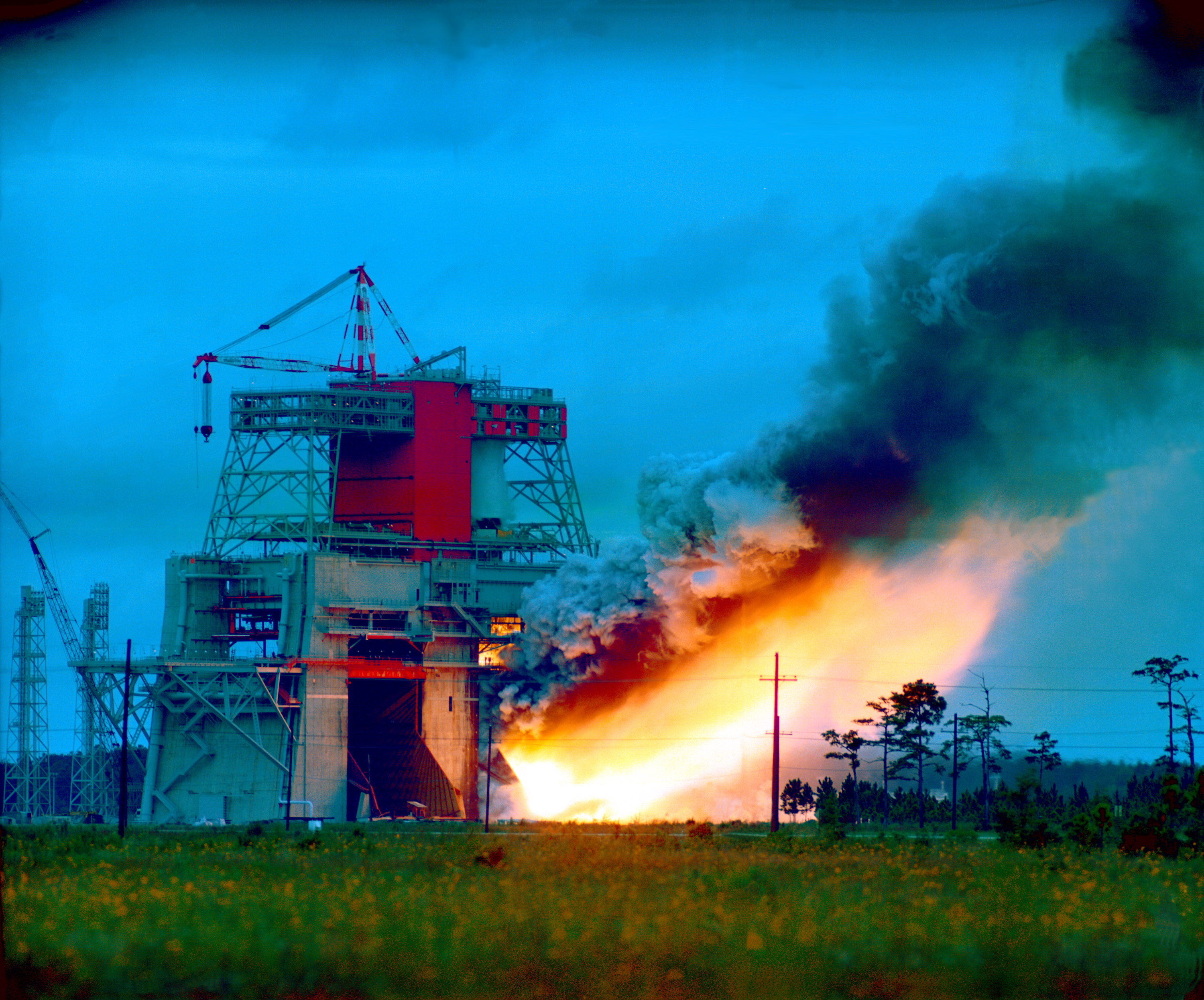
- Static Test Firing S-1C Saturn V Mississippi Test Facility MTF

- Location within Mississippi Location within the United States
- Location: Bay St. Louis, Mississippi
- Built: 1965
- Architect: NASA
- NRHP reference No.: 85002805

Significant dates
- Added to NRHP: October 3, 1985
- Designated NHL: October 3, 1985

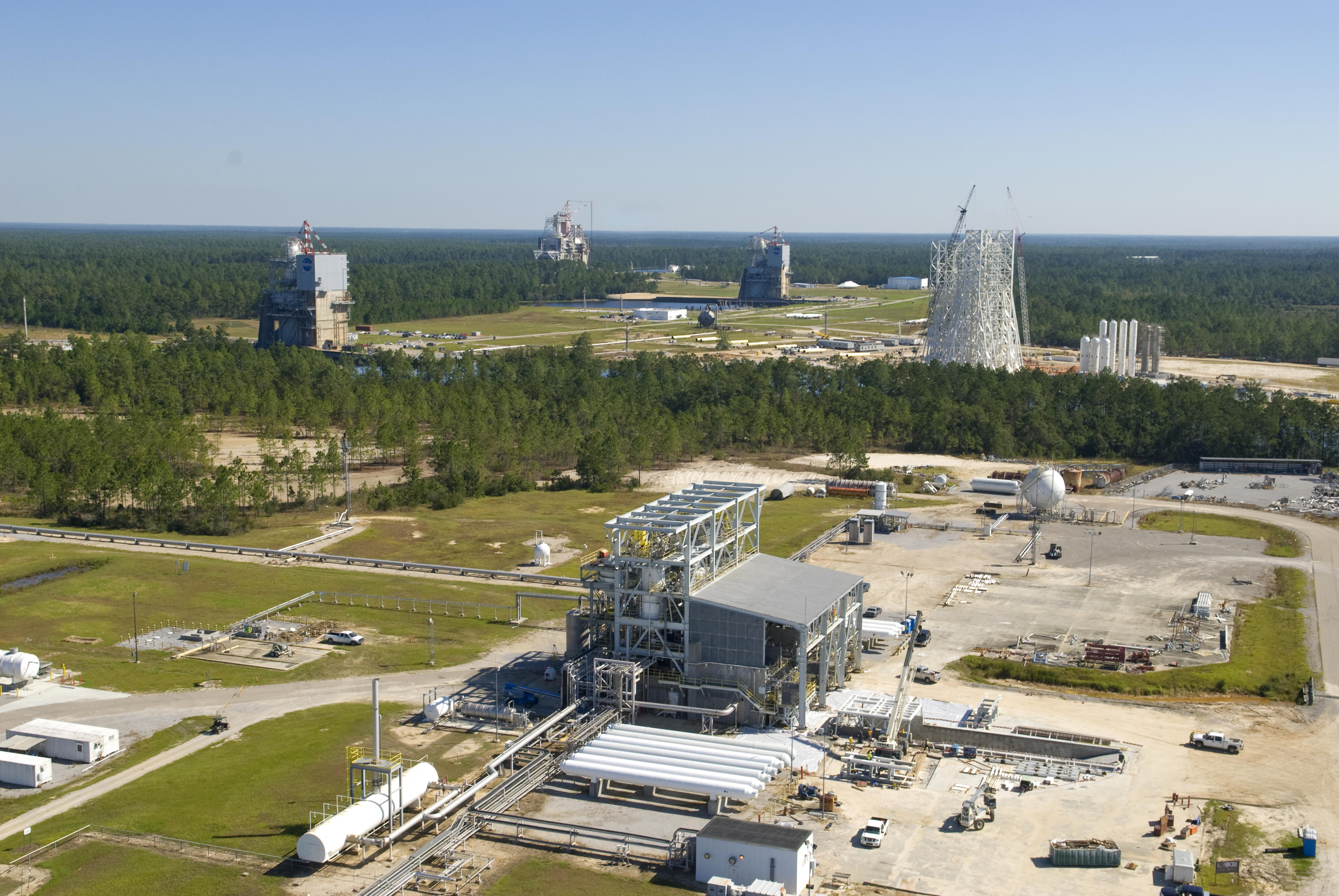
An aerial photo shows all three NASA Stennis Space Center (SSC) test complexes - the E Test Complex (foreground), the three A Test Complex stands (middle) and the B Test Complex (back).

The Rocket Propulsion Test Complex is a rocket testing complex which was built in 1965 as a component of the John C. Stennis Space Center. The Rocket Propulsion Test Complex played an important role in the development of the Saturn V rocket. The A-1, A-2 and B-1/B-2 test stands were declared a National Historic Landmark in 1985. The NASA Engineering & Science Directorate (ESD) at SSC operates and maintains SSC's rocket test stands.

== A-1/A-2 Test stand ==
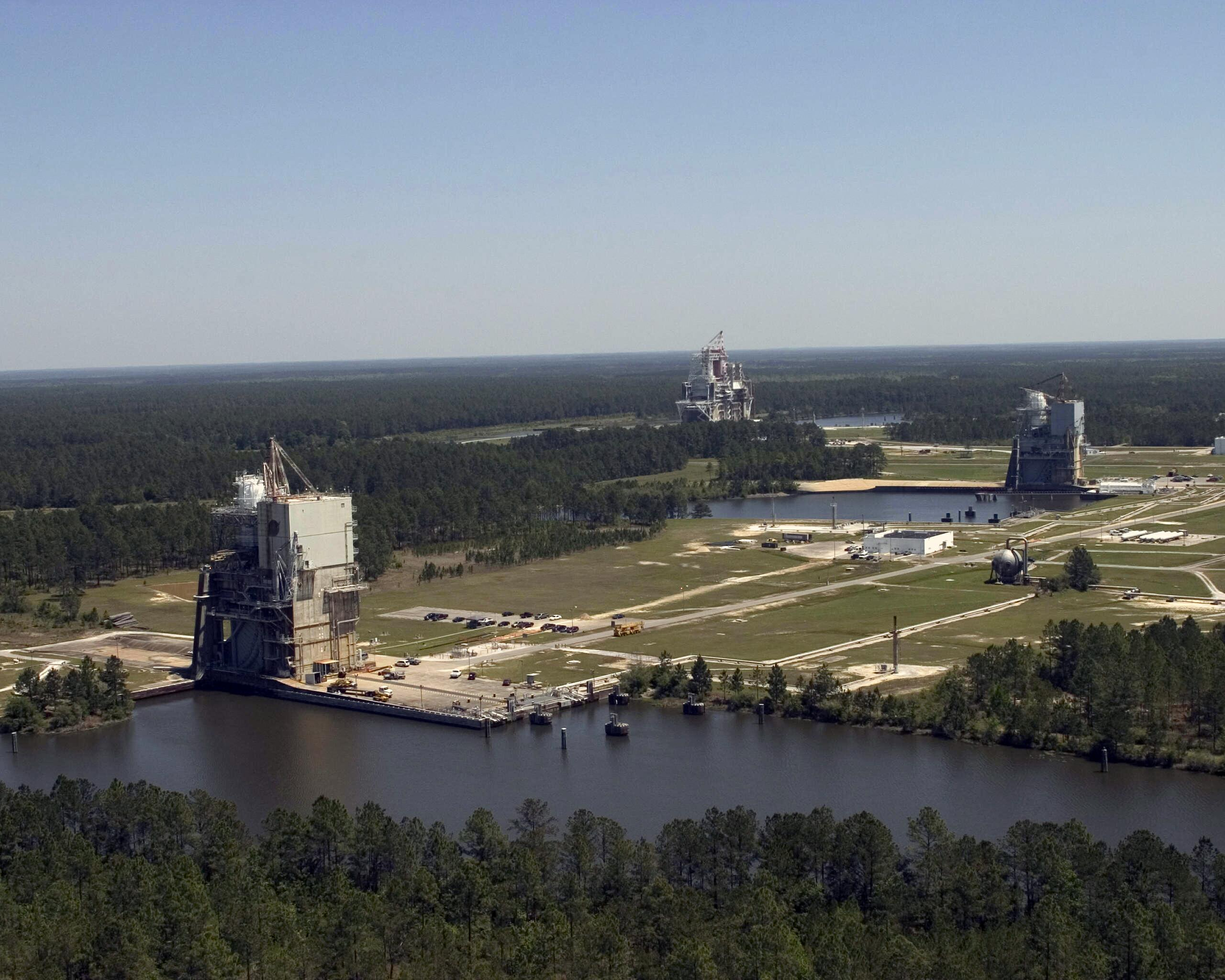
A-1 test stand(foreground), A-2 (mid-ground) and B1/B2 (background)

The smaller two of the original three test stands at Stennis Space Center, the A-1 and A-2 stands were built to test and flight-certify the second stage of the Saturn V, the S-II (pronounced "ess two"), the launch vehicle for the Apollo program. The two stands are similar steel and concrete structures are roughly 200 ft (61 m) tall, and capable of withstanding thrust loads of more than 1 million pounds and temperature of up to 6,000 °F (3,320 °C). Each test stand can provide Liquid Hydrogen (LH2) and liquid oxygen (LOX) in addition to support fluids, gaseous helium (GHe), gaseous hydrogen (GH2) and gaseous nitrogen (GN2) as purge or pressurizing gasses.

=== 1960s ===
Construction began in 1963 and was finished in 1966. The A Test Complex also includes a Test Control Center, observation bunkers, and various technical and support systems.

On 23 April 1966 workmen at the A-2 test stand successfully captive-fired for 15 seconds the S-II-T, Structural and Dynamic Test Vehicle for the Saturn V second stage, in an all-systems test. This was the first test of a flight-weight S-II stage. The stage, largest and most powerful liquid oxygen-liquid hydrogen stage known, developed one million pounds of thrust from its five Rocketdyne J-2 engines. This test also marked the first operational use of the A-2 stand.

The first full-duration firing of the S-II flight stage occurred 20 May 1966 when S-II-T test-fired on the A-2 test stand for 354.5 seconds. LOX cutoff sensors initiated cutoff automatically. The firing passed all major test objectives with the exception of the propellant utilization system. This was the fourth static firing of the S-II-T. The stage developed one million pounds of thrust from its five hydrogen-oxygen-powered J-2 engines.

==== S-II-T rupture ====
A static test version of the Saturn V second stage S-II-T ruptured during pressure tests at SSC on 28 May 1966, and five North American Aviation technicians monitoring the test received minor injuries. The accident occurred when the hydrogen fuel tank failed under pressure. S-II-T, which had five hydrogen-oxygen J-2 engines capable of generating one million pounds of thrust, had been tested May 25 in ground firing but stopped firing after 195 seconds when a hydrogen link leak caused automatic cutoff. At time of the explosion, technicians were trying to determine cause for the hydrogen leak. No hydrogen was in the tank when the explosion occurred. Under the direction of MSFC, a Board of Inquiry headed by Dr. Kurt H. Debus, Director of Kennedy Space Center, convened on the night of May 28. Immediate investigation revealed that the second shift crew, not knowing that the liquid hydrogen pressure sensors and switches had been disconnected, had attempted to pressurize the tank. Believing that a liquid hydrogen vent valve was leaking, the technicians closed the facility by blocking valves. This had caused the vehicle tank to become over-pressurized and burst. On 30 May 1966 the board released its findings after two days of inquiry. The fuel tank of the S-II stage had been pressurized beyond design limits. There was a need for tighter controls over MTF test procedure. Following the destruction of S-II-T, NASA extended the S-II battleship program until July 1967.

S-II-1, the first flight S-II stage scheduled for static firing at MTF, left Seal Beach on July 31, 1966.

The first flight model (S-II-1) of the Saturn V vehicle's second stage arrived August 13, 1966 at MTF completing its 4,000-mile voyage from Seal Beach. Workmen immediately moved the stage into the S-II stage service and checkout building for inspection and preparation for static firing.

On December 1, 1966, North American Aviation conducted a successful 384-second captive firing of five J-2 engines, the first flight hydrogen-fueled engines, developing a total one million pounds of thrust. During the test, number 2 and 4 engine SLAM arms did not drop, resulting in the successful gimballing of engines 1 and 3 only. The test included the recording of about 800 measurements of the stage's performance, including propellant tank temperatures, engine temperatures, propellant flow rates, and vibrations.

On December 30, 1966, MSFC technicians at the MTF test stand conducted a static firing of the first flight version of the Saturn V second stage, S-II-1. This second test firing, like an earlier firing, lasted more than six minutes.

=== 1967 ===
On January 11, 1967, initial post-static checkout of the S-II-1 stage ended at MTF. On January 27, 1967, the S-II-2 stage left Seal Beach, California, to pass through the Panama Canal and on to MTF. After its journey lasting 16 days, the S-II would arrive at MTF for two static tests. The S-II-2 stage arrived on dock at MTF on February 11, 1967. The S-II-2 stage, part of the second Saturn V vehicle (AS-502) scheduled for launch from KSC late in 1967, was scheduled for testing at MTF late in March 1967. On February 17, 1967, the first full-duration test of a cluster of uprated J-2 engines, S-II battleship test No. 041, lasted 360 seconds. On February 25, 1967, workmen completed construction of the S-II A-1 test stand, and the Corps of Engineers accepted beneficial occupancy with exceptions. On March 17, 1967, technicians fired the S-II battleship stage for a mainstage duration of 29 seconds. On March 31, failure of a prevalve to close caused program officials to scrub the first attempt to static fire the S-II-2 stage.

Battleship testing of the S-II battleship test stage equipped with five uprated J-2 engines ended in late March 1967 with a full-duration test of approximately 360 seconds mainstage operation.

=== Summary ===
These two test stands tested and flight-certified S-II stages and J-2 engines until the end of the Apollo program in the early 1970s.

=== 1970s–2000s ===
It was announced in 1971 that the center would be performing tests on the engines for the new Space Shuttle program (called the SSME). The A-1 and A-2 test stands, originally designed to accommodate the physically much larger S-II J-2 engines, were modified to accept the smaller SSME, and testing officially began on May 19, 1975, when the first such engine was tested on the A-1 stand. The center continued to test engines for the duration of the shuttle program, on the A-1 and A-2 stands with the final scheduled test occurred on July 29, 2009, on the A-2 stand.

=== 2010s ===
As the shuttle program is phased out, the A-1 and A-2 test stands are seeing new use testing the next generation of rocket engines, including the J-2X engine designed to power the SLS upper stage, with the first such test occurring on December 18, 2007.

Stennis tested Aerojet Rocketdyne AJ26 rocket engines for Orbital Sciences Corp. of Dulles, Va., which partnered with NASA to provide commercial cargo flights to the International Space Station. Orbital's Antares rocket was powered by a pair of these AJ26 engines. Orbital's maiden flight to the space station launched from NASA's Wallops Flight Facility in Virginia September 18, 2013, powered by two AJ26 engines (E9 and E12) that were tested at Stennis on May 3, 2012, and January 18, 2013.

The first test of the RS-25 engine for use on the Space Launch System (SLS) rocket was conducted January 9, 2015. Stennis completed testing of all 16 heritage RS-25 engines that will help launch the first four SLS missions as part of NASA's Artemis program on April 4, 2019.

=== 2020s ===
The A-1 Test Stand was designated the Fred Haise Test Stand in March 2020, in honor of the Apollo 13 astronaut and Biloxi, Mississippi, native.

The first test of the newly redesigned RS-25 engine was completed December 14, 2022.

== B-1/B-2 Test stand ==
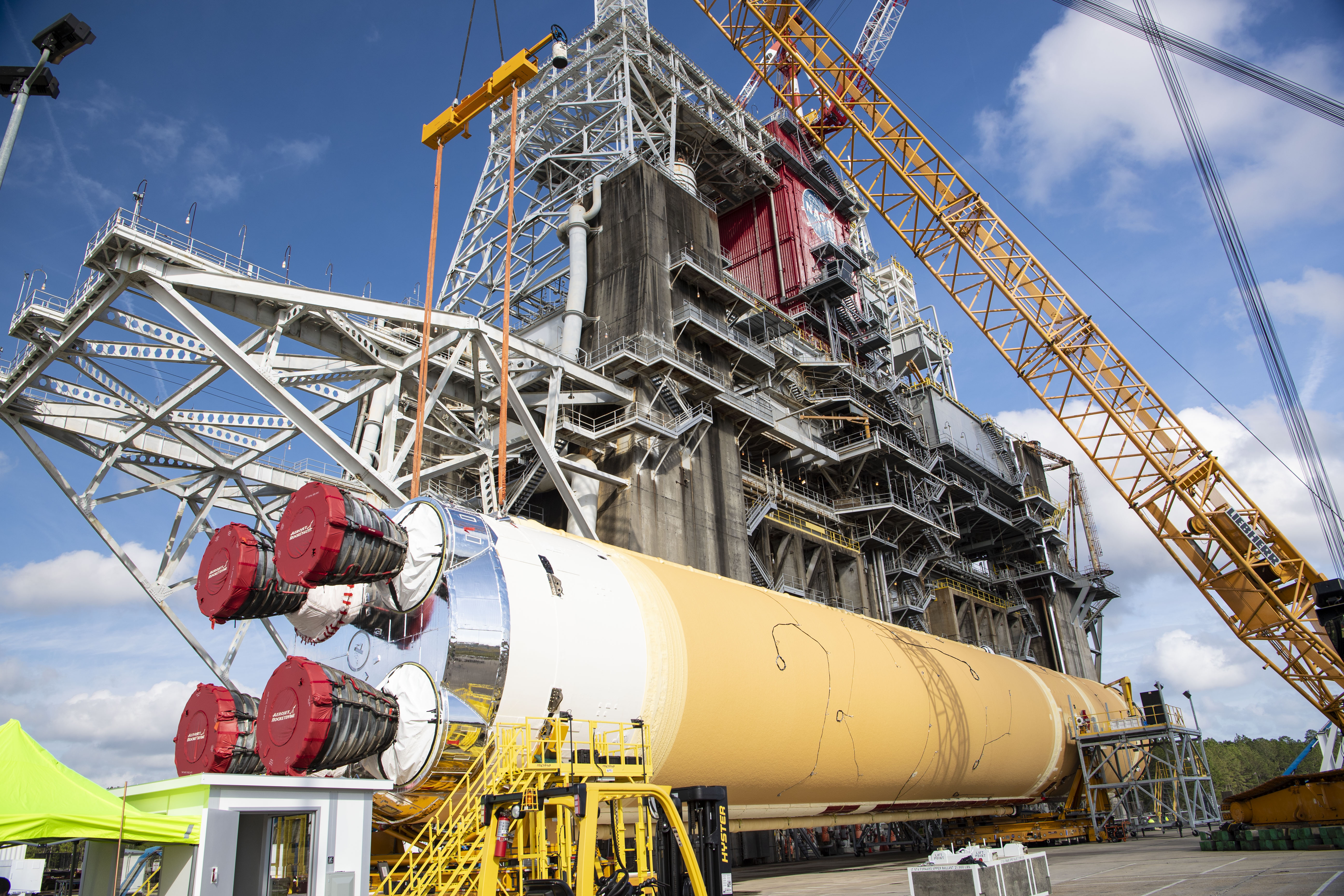
A Space Launch System Rocket Core at Stennis prior to being lifted onto the B2 test stand

The B-1/B-2 test stand is a dual-position, vertical, static-firing stand supporting a maximum dynamic load of 11M lbf. It was originally built in the 1960s to simultaneously test the five F-1 engines of a complete Saturn-V S1-C first stage from 1967 to 1970.

On October 17, 1966, MSFC shipped its S-IC all-system test booster, S-IC-T, to SSC for use in checkout of a static test stand and for use in static firings. Workmen loaded the huge booster aboard the barge Poseidon for the 1,000-mile river journey. Six days later the S-IC-T reached SSC. All future firings would be accomplished at the B-2 stand.

An all-systems test version of Apollo/Saturn V first stage, S-IC-T, went into the B-2 test stand at the Mississippi Test Facility on December 17, 1966. Stage electrical and mechanical hook-up to the test stand began immediately. Static firing would occur in early 1967 to demonstrate the facility checkout system.

=== 1967 ===
On 13 February 1967 Corps of Engineers personnel completed construction of the S-IC B-2 test stand at MTF.

Following an extensive systems, subsystems, and total integrated systems checkout of the B-2 test stand at MTF on March 3, 1967, workmen successfully fired the S-IC battleship/all-systems stage (S-IC-T) for 15 seconds. This S-IC-T test, the first MTF S-IC firing, proved the total compatibility of stage, mechanical support equipment, and S-IC test facilities.

A second S-IC-T firing lasted for 60 seconds on March 17, 1967. This firing validated the flame-bucket-water-flow pattern of the B-2 test stand and ended the facilities checkout test series at MTF.

Boeing personnel removed the S-IC-T from test stand B-2 on March 24, 1967, following post-static checkout, test stand refurbishment, and facilities modification.

=== Post Apollo ===
During the shuttle era it was modified to test the Space Shuttle Main Engine (SSME). Stennis now leases the B-1 test position to Pratt & Whitney Rocketdyne for testing of RS-68 engines for the Delta IV launch vehicle. NASA has prepared the B-2 test position to test the core stage of NASA's Space Launch System (SLS), which it first did in early 2021. The SLS Core Stage, with four RS-25D rocket engines, was installed on the stand for propellant fill and drain testing and two hot-fire tests.

== A-3 Test stand ==
In August 2007, NASA began construction of the A-3 test stand at SSC. The A-3 stand was to be used for testing J-2X engines under vacuum conditions simulating high altitude operation. A-3 will also be operable as a sea-level test facility. However, because the Constellation Program was cancelled in 2010, the stand is expected to be unused after its completion. The A-3 stand may however, be able to be refurnished to test a new mission when needed. In 2014, journalists writing for Bloomberg News and the Washington Times criticized the continued construction work on the $350 million test stand, and characterized it as a wasteful earmark by Mississippi U.S. senator Roger F. Wicker.

American-New Zealand launch service provider Rocket Lab intends to use the A-3 stand to develop and test their Archimedes reusable rocket engine.

== E Test stand complex ==
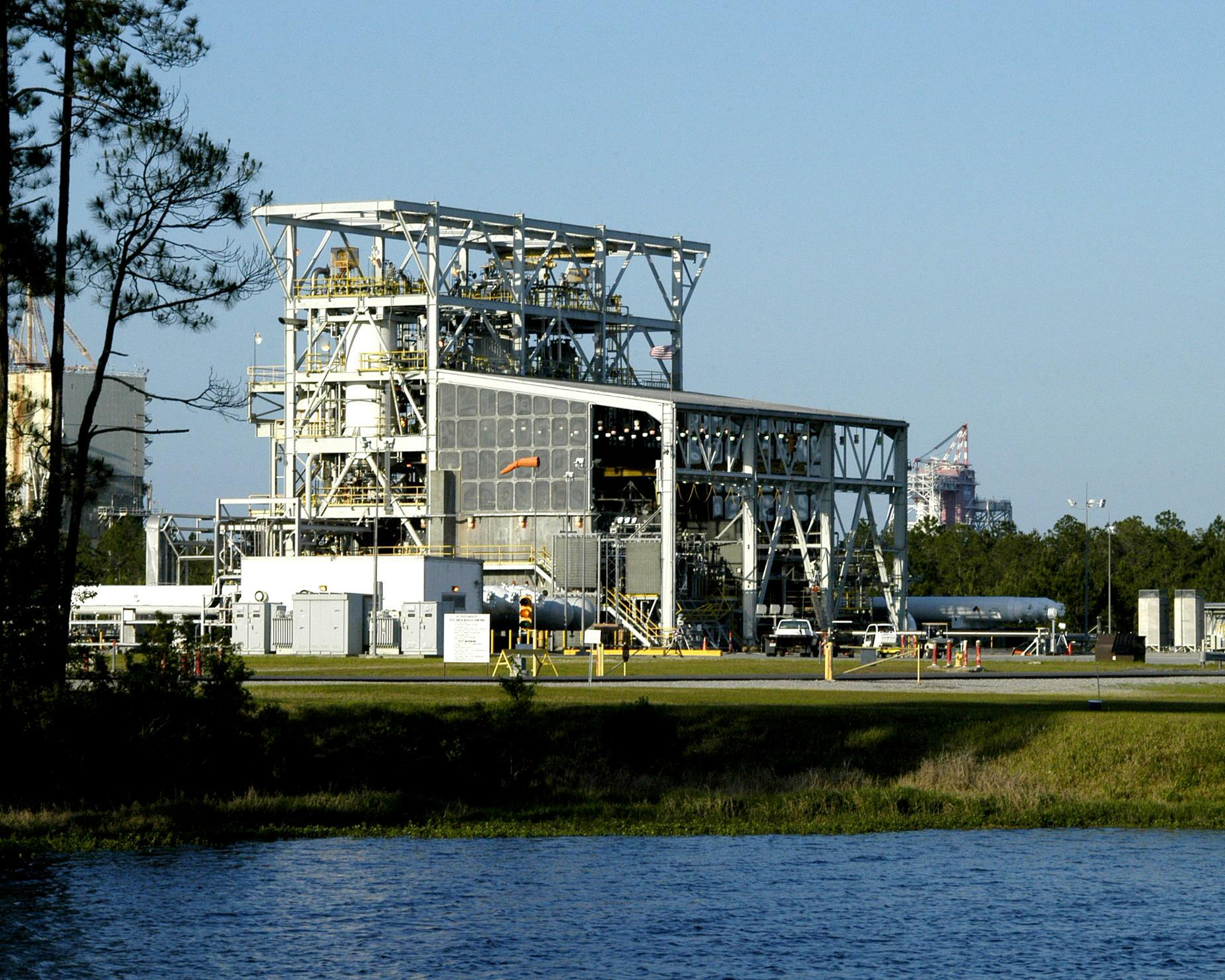
E test stand complex in 2005

In the 1990s, a new test complex named "E" was constructed to test a variety of new small engine and single/multiple components and concepts. The E test stand complex consists of four distinct test stands

=== E1 Test stand ===
==== History ====
In 2012, Blue Origin tested the thrust chamber assembly at the E-1 test cell for its new 100,000 pounds-force (440 kN) thrust BE-3 liquid oxygen/liquid hydrogen rocket engine. As part of Blue's Reusable Booster System (RBS), the engines are designed eventually to launch the biconic-shaped Space Vehicle the company is developing.

On 22 May 2014, an AJ26 rocket engine under test on the Stennis E-1 test stand, for a future Orbital Sciences Antares launch, failed and caused major damage to the E-1 test stand. As of 10 June, neither NASA, Orbital, nor Aerojet Rocketdyne have released any additional information on the extent of the damage, nor time frame when the three test cells in the E-1 test stand will return to operational status. As of early June 2014, the E-1 test stand was non-operational pending the completion of an investigation into a rocket engine failure on the test stand on 22 May 2014.

In June 2015, Aerojet Rocketdyne signed a contract with NASA to upgrade the E-1 test stand so that the "multi-element pre-burner and main injector" of the AR-1 rocket engine could be tested there, with a goal of first flight of the new AR-1 engine after 2019.

==== Description ====
The stand is composed of three individual test "cells":

- E1 Cell 1 can handle liquid-propellant and hybrid based test articles up to 750,000 pounds-force (3,300 kN) of thrust in a horizontal position.
- E1 Cells 2 and 3 are designed to support LOX and LH2 turbopump assemblies for testing with high-pressure propellant feeds.

=== E2 Test stand ===
The E2 test facility at Stennis has multiple test cells that support three separate test stands (Cell 1 and Cell 2), for testing horizontally mounted engines and for vertically mounted vehicle stages and/or engines. Cell 1 can support engines with up to 100,000 pounds-force (440 kN) of thrust while Cell 2 can support vehicle stages with up to 324,000 pounds-force (1,440 kN) of thrust. The facility can provide liquid oxygen, liquid nitrogen, liquid hydrogen, liquid methane, rocket-grade kerosene (RP1), H_{2}O, gaseous hydrogen, "hot" gaseous hydrogen, gaseous oxygen and gaseous nitrogen.

E2 Cell 1, originally known as the High Heat Flux Facility (HHFF), was constructed in 1993 to support materials development for the National Aerospace Plane (NASP).

The E2 test stand was modified after 2013 to support liquid methane engine testing, with funds being provided by SpaceX, the Mississippi Development Authority (US$500,000 using funding from state bond issues), and NASA (up to US$600,000). As of October 2013, the SpaceX funding commitment to the methane modification project has not yet been disclosed, as the contract has not yet been finalized and executed. The methane modifications will become a permanent part of the Stennis test infrastructure and will be available to other users of the test facility after the SpaceX facility lease is completed. As of October 2013, the most recent test completed on the E2 test stand had been a 2012 NASA test of chemical steam generators.

Beginning in 2014, SpaceX conducted component tests of their liquid methane/liquid oxygen Raptor rocket engine on the E2 test stand. This testing was limited to components of the Raptor engine, since the test stand is not large enough to test the full Raptor engine, which is rated to generate more than 661,000 lbf (2,940 kN) vacuum thrust. SpaceX completed a "round of main injector testing in late 2014," and a "full-power test of the oxygen preburner component" for Raptor by June 2015.

=== E3 Test stand ===
The E3 test stand consists of two test cells for component and pilot scale combustion device testing:

- E3 Cell 1 can support devices up to 60,000 pounds-force (270,000 N) thrust in a horizontal position. Propellant supports includes LOX or gaseous oxygen/hydrocarbon, gaseous oxygen/gaseous hydrogen and hybrid.
- E3 Cell 2 can support devices up to 25,000 pounds-force (110,000 N) thrust in a vertical position. Propellent configurations are similar to E3 Cell 1 with the addition of hydrogen peroxide based devices.

A series of tests conducted in the late 1990s eventually led to the commercialization of hybrid rocket motors. Test firing an American Rocket Company (AMROC) hybrid rocket motor at NASA's Stennis Space Center in 1994.

=== E4 Test stand ===
The E4 test stand consists of four 32 foot tall concrete-walled cells and an associated concrete foundation; a 1,344 square foot hardened and conditioned Signal Conditioning Building; a 12,825 square foot high bay with 10 ton bridge crane, shop area with 1 ton bridge crane, and a 7,000 square foot blast hardened Test Control Center; and two 1,400 square foot raised-floor control rooms. The site also includes underground deluge water piping; underground power, data, and control duct banks; and potable water. The E4 hard stand system was designed to accommodate up to 500,000 pounds-force (2,224 kN) engines and powerpack systems testing in a horizontal configuration. The E4 test stand was proposed in the year 2000 to be located near the H1 test stand.

== H-1 Test stand ==
In 2001, the Pentagon's Ballistic Missile Defense Organization proposed construction of a $140 million facility at Stennis H-1 test stand to test its proposed Space-Based Laser (SBL) to begin in the first quarter of fiscal year 2002. The facility was to be used to evaluate beam quality, efficiency, and power levels for a prototype megawatt-class hydrogen fluoride laser.

In 2007, British manufacturer Rolls-Royce plc has been operating an outdoor aero-engine test facility built on the old H1 test area. Rolls-Royce constructed the facility due to noise pollution concerns at its UK testing facility at Hucknall Airfield near its headquarters in Derby.

In 2013, a second test stand was opened by Rolls-Royce.

== List of center directors ==
The following persons had served as the Stennis Space Center director:

No.	Image	Director	Start	End	Notes
1		William C. Fortune	September 1963	May 1965	Manager, Mississippi Test Operation
2		Jackson M. Balch	July 1, 1965	June 14, 1974	Manager, Mississippi Test Facility
2		Jackson M. Balch	June 14, 1974	August 31, 1976	Manager, National Space Technology Laboratories
3		Jerry Hlass	September 1, 1976	May 20, 1988	Manager, National Space Technology Laboratories
3		Jerry Hlass	May 20, 1988	January 23, 1989	Director, Stennis Space Center
4		Roy S. Estess	January 23, 1989	February 22, 2001	
Acting		Mark K. Craig	February 23, 2001	April 1, 2002	
5		Roy S. Estess	April 2, 2002	August 24, 2002	
6		William W. Parsons Jr.	August 25, 2002	May 9, 2003	
Interim		Michael U. Rudolphi	May 9, 2003	January 5, 2004	
7		Thomas Q. Donaldson	January 5, 2004	September 19, 2005	
8		William W. Parsons Jr.	September 19, 2005	January 23, 2006	
9		Richard J. Gilbrech	January 23, 2006	October 2007	
10		Robert D. Cabana	October 2007	October 15, 2008	
11		Arthur E. Goldman	October 15, 2008	February 28, 2010	
12		Patrick Scheuermann	March 1, 2010	September 24, 2012	
13		Richard J. Gilbrech	September 25, 2012	January 13, 2024	
Acting		John W. Bailey Jr.	January 13, 2024	April 28, 2024	
14		John W. Bailey Jr.	April 29, 2024	June 2026	
Acting		Christine Powell	June 2026	September 2026	
15		Christine Powell	September 2026	present	

== Gallery ==
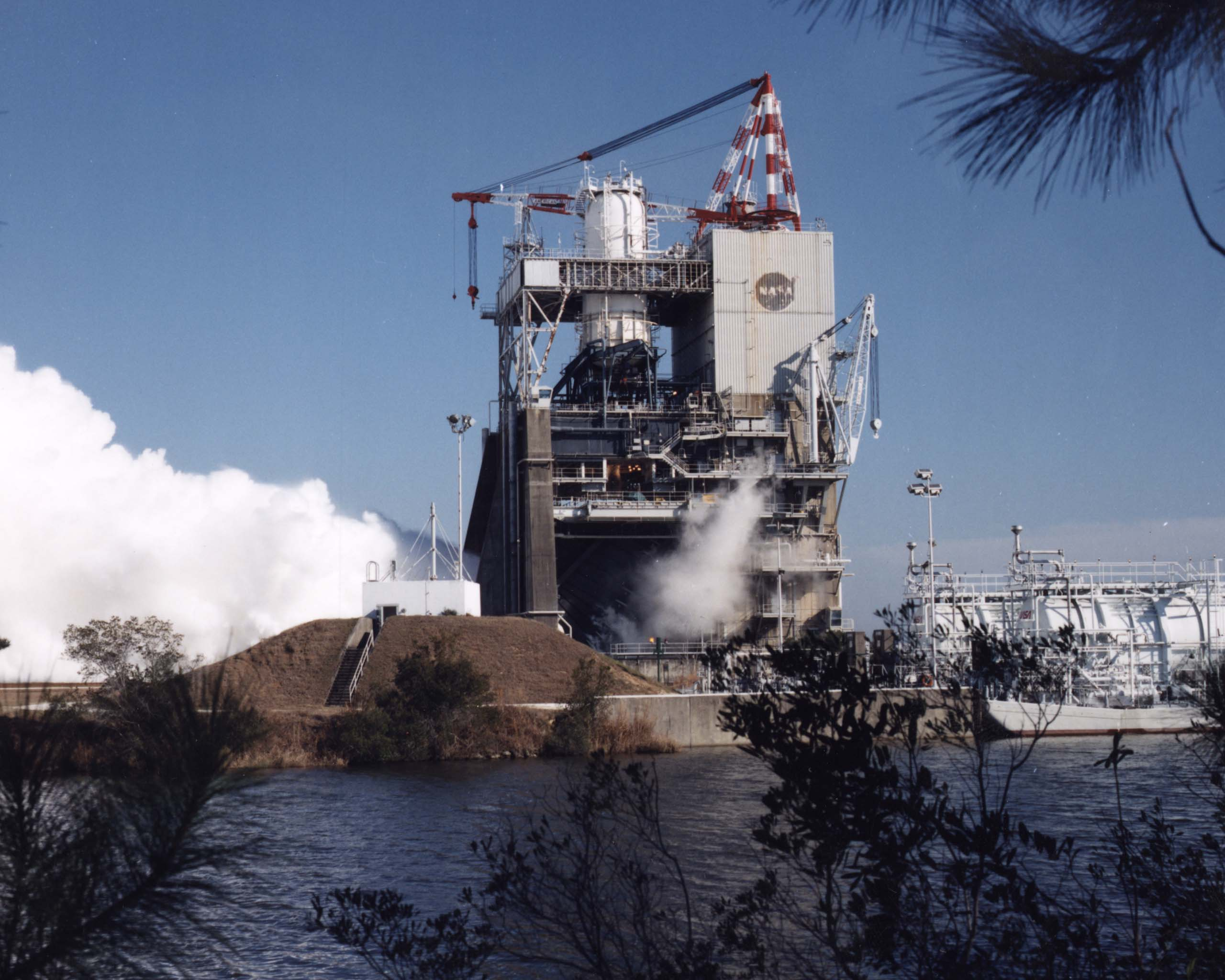
Shuttle main engine test in the A-1 Test Stand.

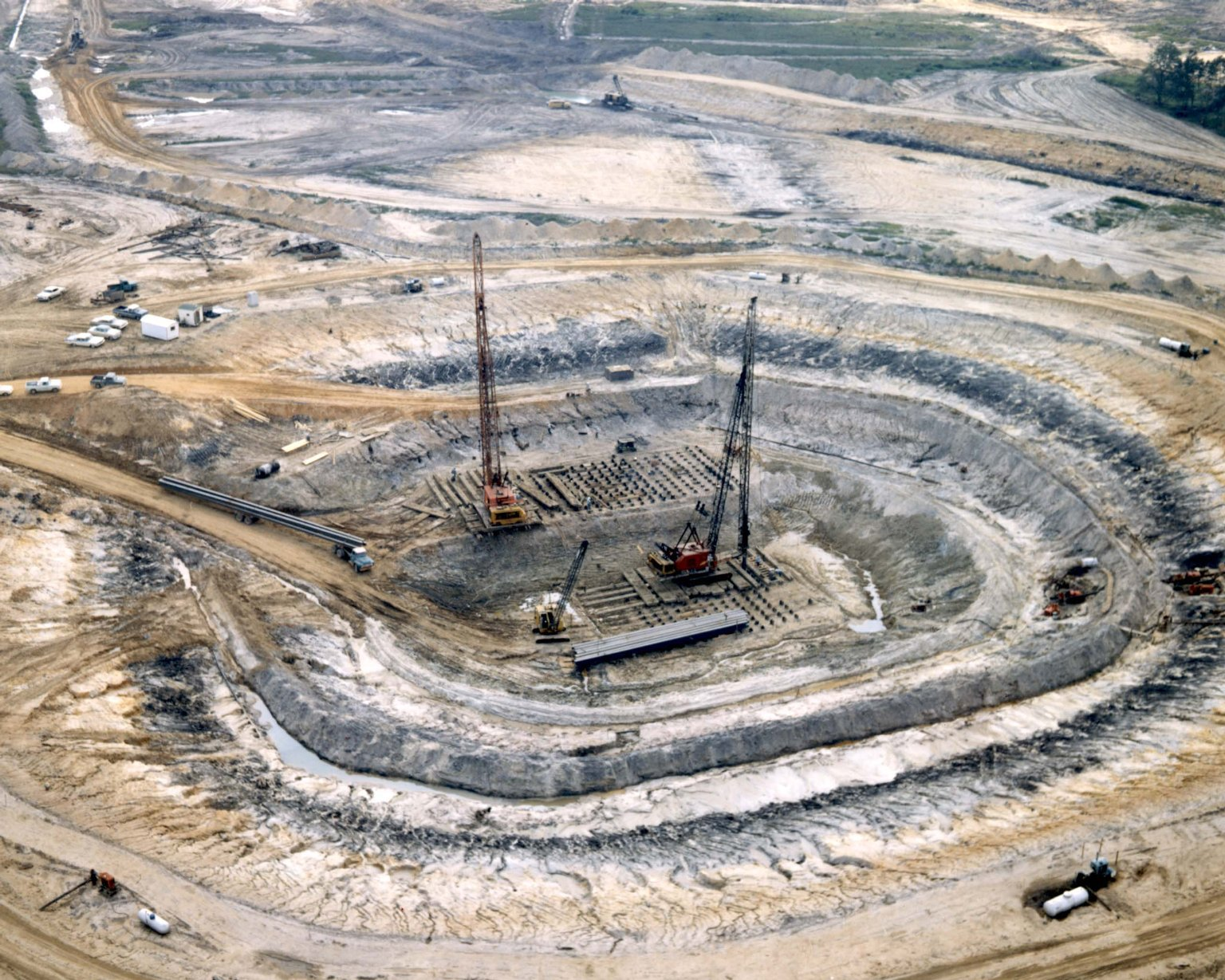
Construction of the A-2 Test Stand.

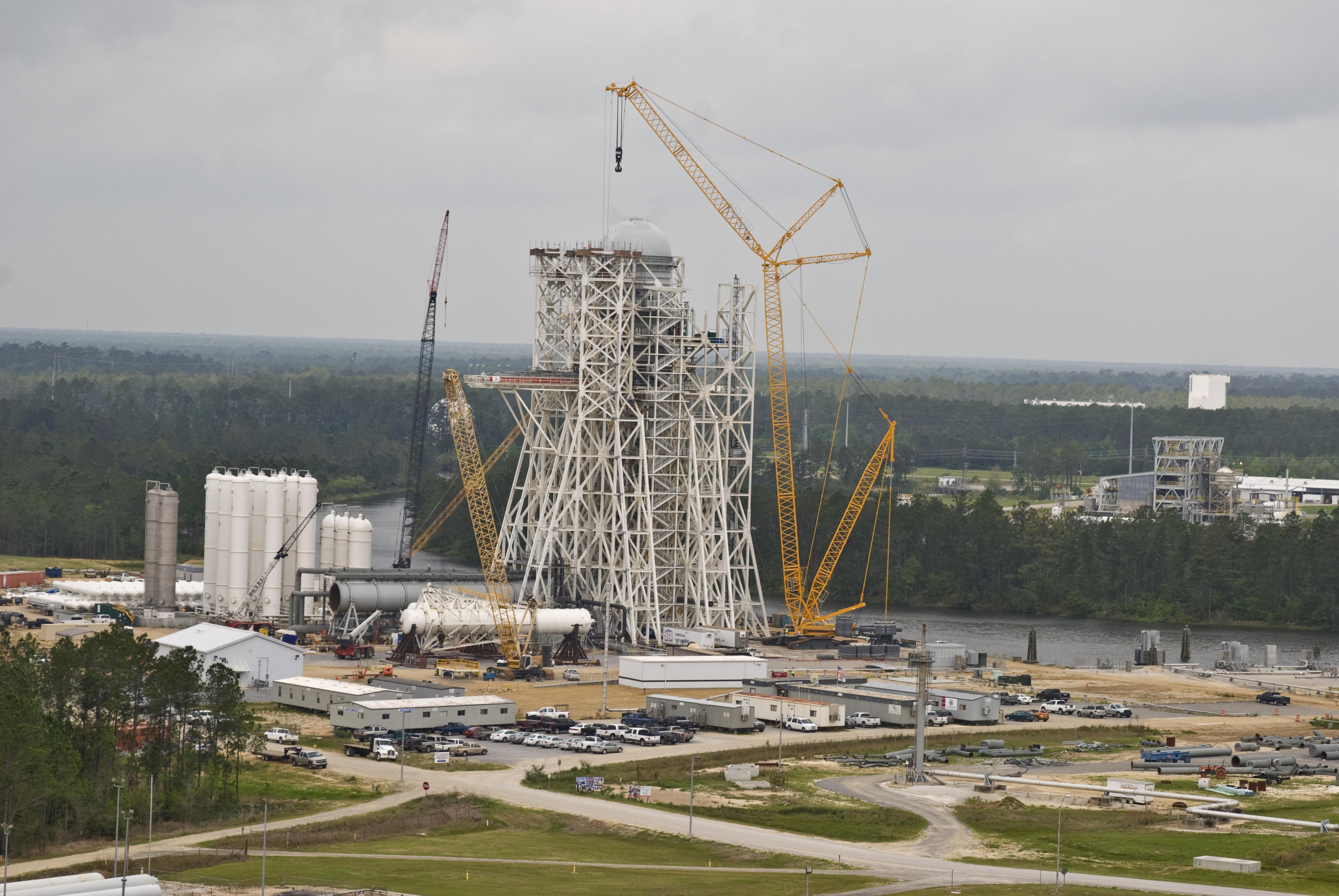
A-3 test stand under construction in March 2011.

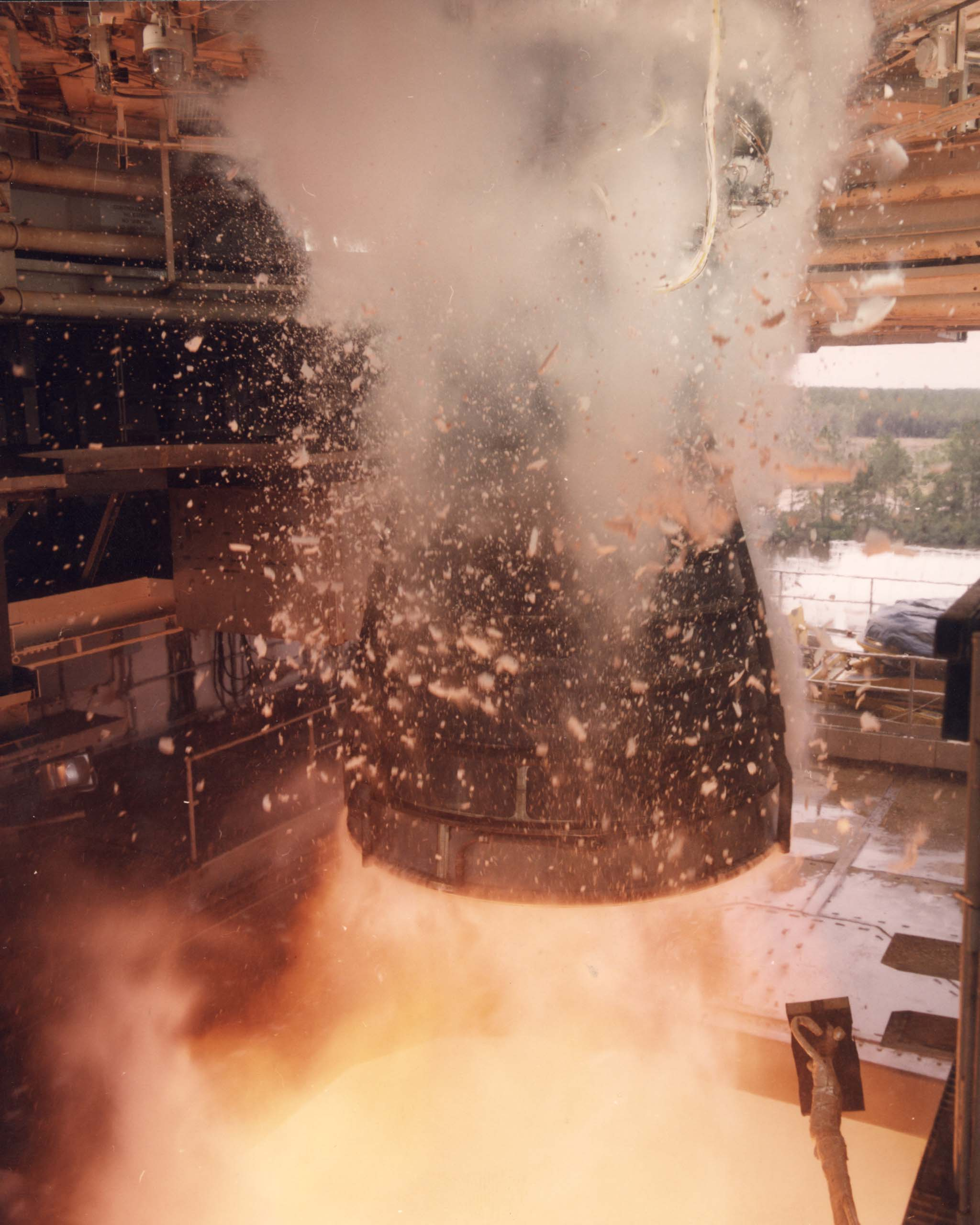
Test firing of a Space Shuttle Main Engine in the A-1 Test Stand.

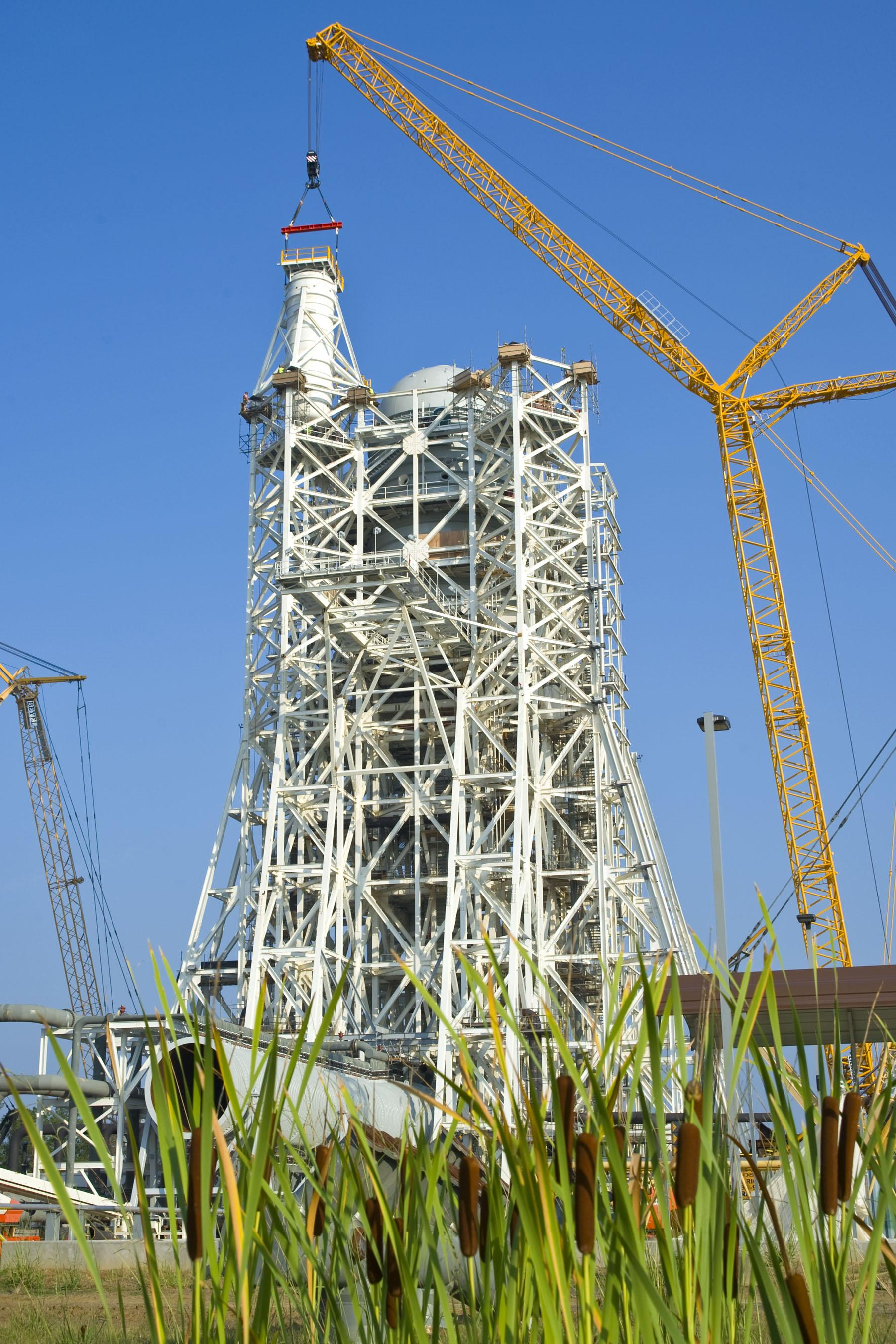
Installation of a 35,000-gallon Liquid oxygen tank atop the A-3 Test Stand.

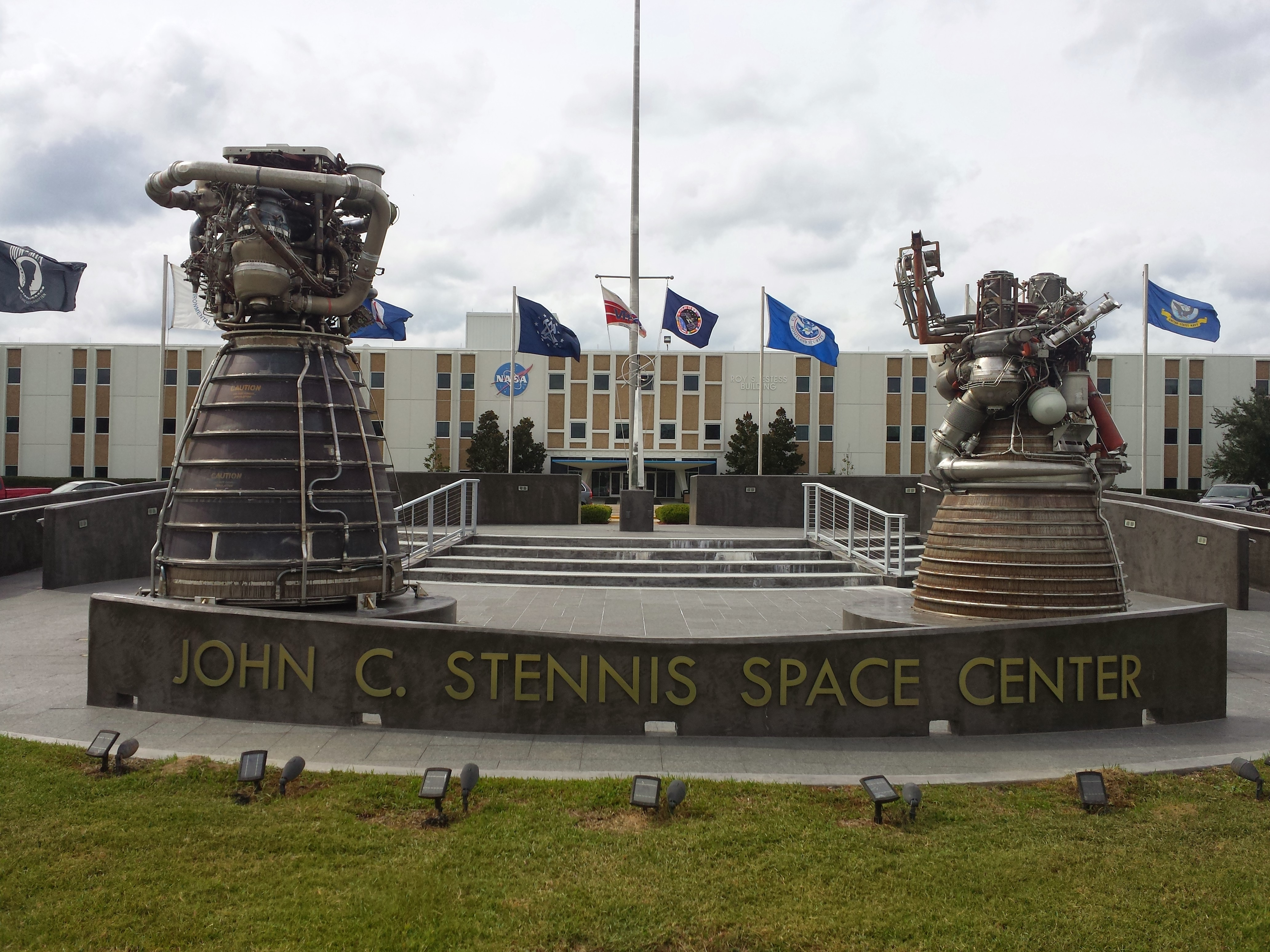
NASA's Stennis Headquarters

== Tenant facilities ==
In 2005, the center was home to over 30 government agencies and private companies. By far the largest of these were elements of the United States Navy with some 3,500 personnel, which was far larger than the NASA civil servant contingent. Some of the prominent resident agencies include:

=== US National Oceanic and Atmospheric Administration ===
- The National Data Buoy Center (NDBC) is a part of the National Oceanic and Atmospheric Administration's (NOAA) National Weather Service (NWS). NDBC designs, develops, operates, and maintains a network of data collecting buoys and coastal stations.
- National Centers for Environmental Information
- National Marine Fisheries Service, Southeast Region, Field Office Stennis Space Center
- Office of Ocean Exploration and Research

=== US Geological Survey ===
- The US Geological Survey Hydrologic Instrumentation Facility

=== United States Navy ===
- The Naval Meteorology and Oceanography Command (NAVMETOCCOM) or NMOC, serves as the operational arm of the Naval Oceanography Program. Headquartered at the SSC, NMOC is a third echelon command reporting to Naval Information Dominance Forces (NAVIDFOR), previously United States Fleet Forces Command (USFLTFORCOM).
- A branch of the Naval Research Laboratory
- The Naval Oceanographic Office (NAVOCEANO) comprises approximately 1,000 civilian, military and contract personnel responsible for providing oceanographic products and services to all elements within the Department of Defense.
- The Department of the Navy, Office of Civilian Human Resources, Stennis Operations Center
- Navy Special Boat Team 22 and NAVSCIATTS (Naval Small Craft Instruction and Technical Training School).

=== United States Coast Guard ===
- Port Security Unit 308

== University ==
- Mississippi State University
  - High Performance Computing Collaboratory
  - Geosystems Research Institute
  - Northern Gulf Institute
- The University of Southern Mississippi
  - High Performance Visualization Center
  - Department of Marine Science

=== Commercial ===
- Rolls-Royce Outdoor Engine Testing Centre
- United Launch Alliance engine testing
- The Lockheed Martin Mississippi Space and Technology Center
- Skydweller Aero – uncrewed solar aircraft flight operations

=== Former tenant organizations ===
- Mississippi Army Ammunition Plant

=== INFINITY Science Center ===
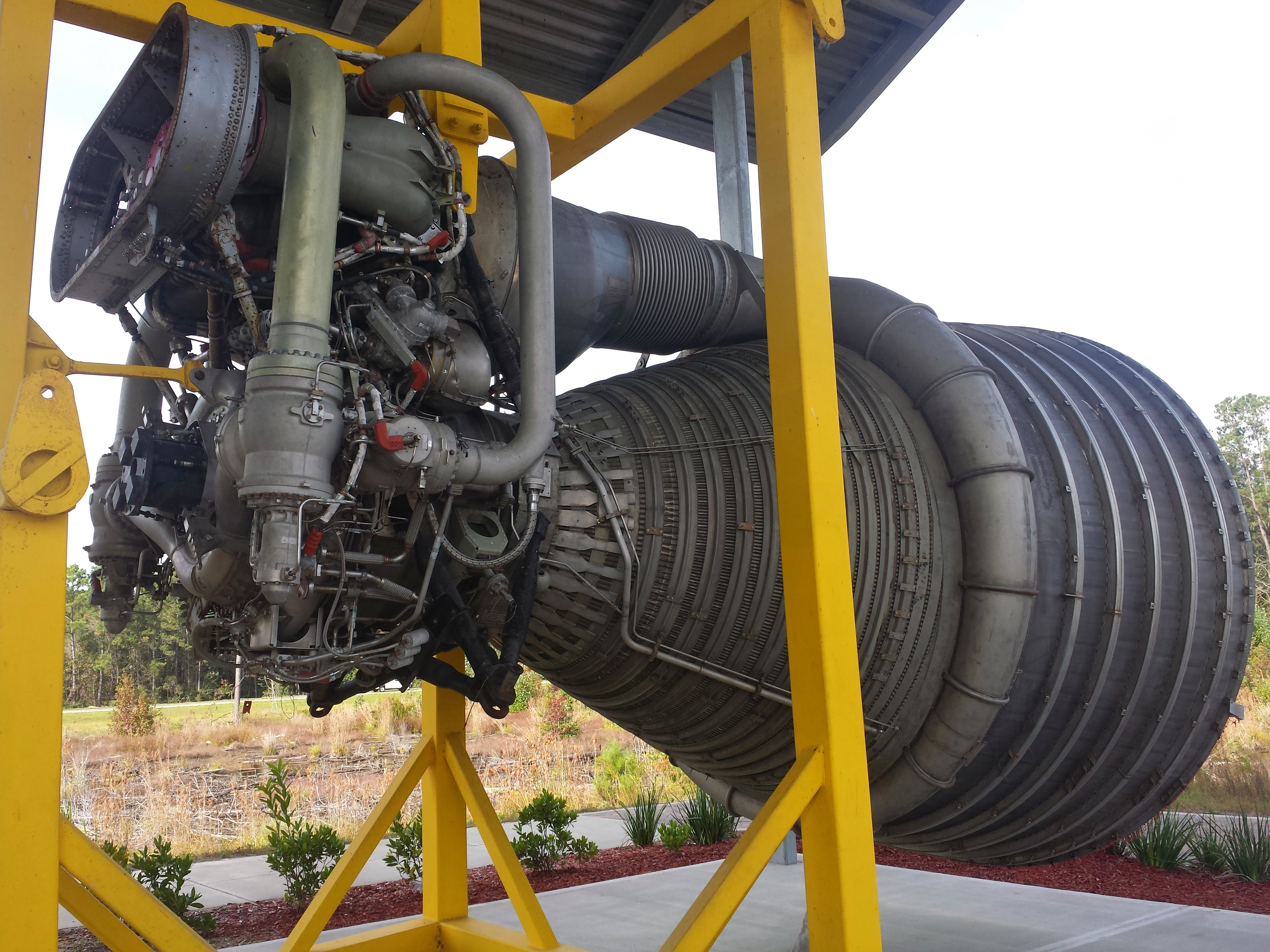
F-1 engine on display at INFINITY science center.

The INFINITY Science Center is a non-profit museum that hosts the NASA visitor center for John C. Stennis Space Center. The 72,000 square feet (6,700 m^{2}) facility is located adjacent to the Mississippi Welcome Center near the MS/LA border.

The themes of the center's interactive exhibits include Mississippi Natural History, NASA, space, planets, stars, weather, Earth science, space travel and exploration. Displays include the Apollo 4 command module, a full-sized International Space Station module, a cutaway model of the Orion spacecraft, and components from a space-flown RS-25 Space Shuttle Main Engine. Outdoor displays include an F-1 rocket engine, a tsunami buoy, U.S. Navy riverine training boat and the Apollo 19 Saturn V first stage rocket booster (acquired from NASA Michoud Assembly).

The INFINITY Science Center officially opened in April 2012 to replace the old 14,000 square feet (1,300 m^{2}) StenniSphere visitors center.

=== StenniSphere ===
The museum and visitor center for the Stennis Space Center was known as StenniSphere. Upon the imminent opening of the new INFINITY Science Center, StenniSphere closed its doors to the public on February 15, 2012. Unlike INFINITY, the StenniSphere building is located within the grounds of the Stennis Space Center. Exhibits focused on the activities of NASA, space, space exploration, science, geography, weather and more. Many of the exhibits from StenniSphere have been moved into the new INFINITY visitor facility.
