= Mississippi Army Ammunition Plant =

Coordinates: 30°23′48″N 89°36′31″W

Joint Munitions Command
- Active: 1983–2009
- Country: United States
- Website: https://www.jmc.army.mil/

The Mississippi Army Ammunition Plant was a 13,480-acre (54.6 km^{2}) government-owned, contractor-operated facility in Hancock County, Mississippi that was dedicated on March 31, 1983. Construction in the northern part of the John C. Stennis Space Center facility began on January 8, 1978. The plant was deactivated on March 4, 2009, as part of the Base Realignment and Closure, 2005. The plant was last operated by Mason Technologies, Inc., a subsidiary of Mason and Hanger-Silas Co., Inc.
