= Coast Guard Aviation Association =

American military fraternal organization

The Coast Guard Aviation Association, also known as the Ancient Order of the Pterodactyl (AOP), is a fraternal association founded in 1977. The organization has the purpose of focusing on United States Coast Guard aviation history. On 5 May 2007, the organization was officially renamed the Coast Guard Aviation Association.

Membership is for former and present officers and enlisted personnel of the United States Coast Guard, and designated pilots of other military services and foreign governments who have piloted Coast Guard aircraft while involved in exchange programs between the Coast Guard and their respective service or government.

Its goals include furthering and preserving the history of Coast Guard aviation and maintaining camaraderie between past and present coast guardsmen. The Coast Guard Aviation Association is headquartered in Chantilly, Virginia.

== Activities ==
The Order hosts an annual gathering known as the "Roost". A Roost is normally anchored by a Coast Guard Air Station.

List of past Roost locations:

- 1977 Long Beach, California
- 1978 San Francisco, California
- 1979 San Francisco, California
- 1980 Mobile, Alabama
- 1981 Elizabeth City, North Carolina
- 1982 Traverse City, Michigan
- 1983 San Diego, California
- 1984 Mobile, Alabama
- 1985 Washington, D.C.
- 1986 Corpus Christi, Texas
- 1987 Port Angeles, Washington
- 1988 New Orleans, Los Angeles
- 1989 Elizabeth City, North Carolina
- 1990 Oshkosh, Wisconsin
- 1991 Pensacola, Florida
- 1992 Astoria, Oregon
- 1993 Clearwater, Florida
- 1994 Traverse City, Michigan
- 1995 San Diego, California
- 1996 Cape Cod, Massachusetts
- 1997 NAS Pensacola, Florida
- 1998 Colorado Springs, Colorado
- 1999 Atlantic City, New Jersey
- 2000 Seattle, Washington (Boeing Air Museum)
- 2001 Miami, Florida
- 2002 Mobile, Alabama
- 2003 Elizabeth City, North Carolina
- 2004 Sacramento, California
- 2005 Savannah, Georgia
- 2006 Traverse City, Michigan
- 2007 Washington, DC
- 2008 Astoria, Oregon
- 2009 Elizabeth City, Nort Carolina
- 2010 Jacksonville, Florida
- 2011 Mobile, Alabama
- 2012 Sacramento, California
- 2013 Washington, DC
- 2014 Cape Cod, Massachusetts
- 2015 San Diego, California
- 2016 Mobile, Alabama
- 2017 Atlantic City, New Jersey
- 2018 Traverse City, Michigan
