= Roy Estess =

American government official

Roy S. Estess
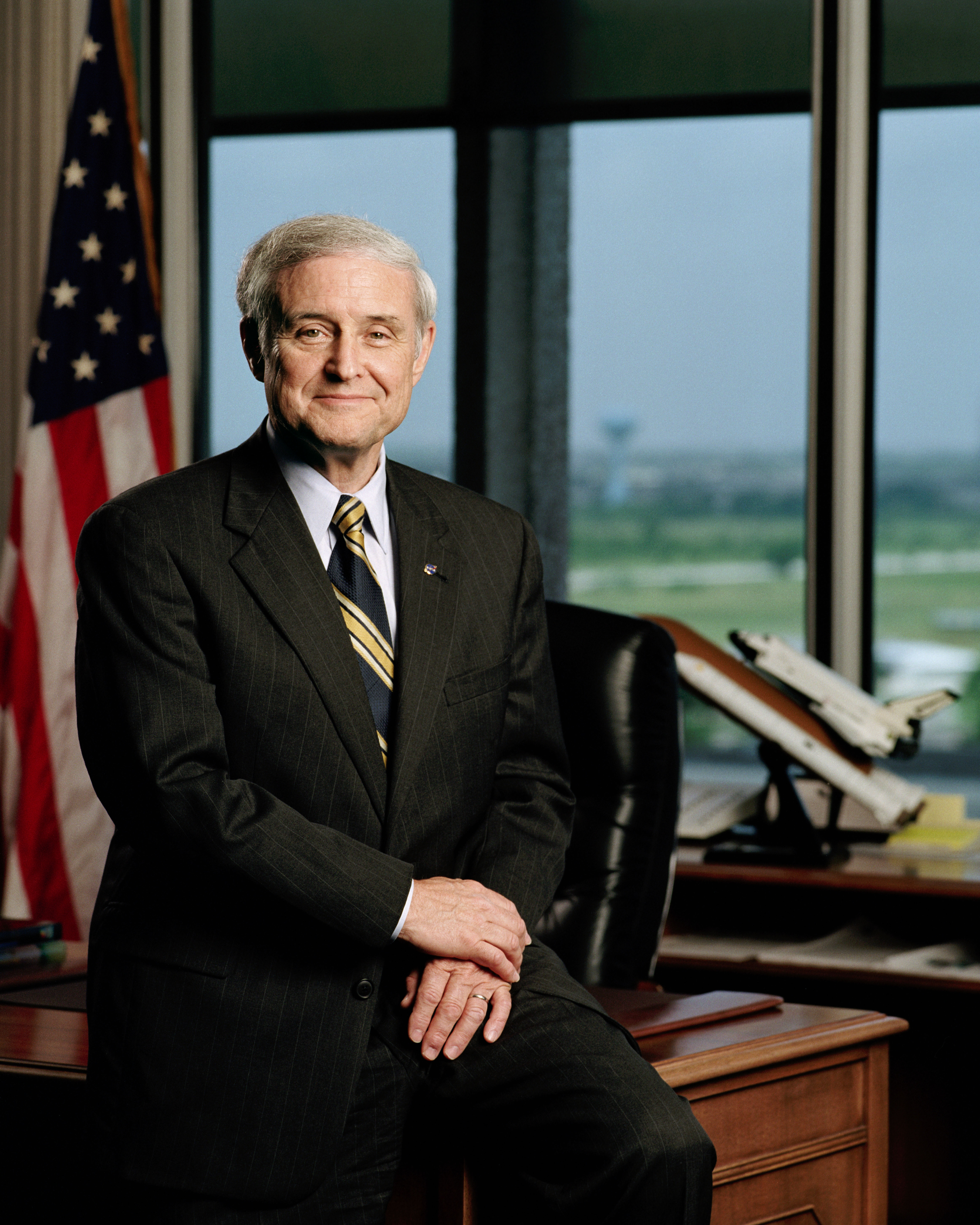
- Born: January 5, 1939
- Died: June 25, 2010 (aged 71)
- Occupations: Test engineer, Director of Stennis Space Center, Acting Center Director of Johnson Space Center

Roy S. Estess (January 5, 1939 – June 25, 2010) was the fourth director of the Stennis Space Center (SSC), having held a variety of managerial positions at the center that prepared him to lead the facility during the dynamic years of the 1990s. Estess, a native Mississippian and a graduate of Mississippi State University, came to the center as a Apollo Program Engine quality control engineer in 1966 and worked his way up through the ranks to the Director of the Stennis Space Center.

During his early years in key positions at the facility and while serving on temporary duty at NASA Headquarters, Estess came to be known as a "straightshooter." Many describe him as a no-nonsense manager who has the ability of cutting through the chaff to get to the heart of a problem or situation.

His first assignment at SSC, known then as the Mississippi Test Facility, was as a test engineer working on the Saturn V S-II second stage test program, part of the Apollo Project. When the facility's manager, Jackson Balch, began diversifying the installation in the early 1970s, he assigned Estess to serve as one of his marketers. Balch tasked Estess with searching for new and compatible federal and state agencies to share in the vast facilities and diverse programs starting up at the center.

Estess was then named head of the Applications Engineering Office that related to the new agencies and the public sector. He later served as deputy of the Earth Resources Laboratory (ERL). His organizational and management skills were further developed during his tenure as director of the Regional Applications Program (RAP). The RAP was an innovative approach to assist the 17 Sun Belt states in the application of remote sensing technology to resource planning and management. Estess was selected as the center's deputy director in 1980 when the facility was known as the National Space Technologies Laboratories (NSTL).

As deputy director, from 1980–1989, Estess was asked to handle several significant tasks that led to the further development of the center. He served for three years as the Agency's Equal Opportunity officer, interim director of the ERL, and completed the Advanced Management Program at Harvard School of Business.

In 1989, he was named Center Director of Stennis and served in that role until 2002. He also served as (acting) Center Director of Johnson Space Center.

== Awards and career highlights ==
- 2006 Appointed to the board of trustees of the Mississippi Institutions of Higher Learning by Governor Haley Barbour.
- 2003 Rotary National Award for Space Achievement's National Space Trophy
- 2003 Boy Scouts of America Distinguished Eagle Scout Award
- 2002 Retired as Director of the Stennis Space Center
- 2002 NASA Outstanding Leadership Medal
- 2001 Created a Team of South MS Business Leaders that became the board of directors for the Infinity Science Center
- 2001 Appointed Acting Director of the Johnson Space Center
- 2000 Distinguished Service Medal
- 1997 Presidential Rank Award of Distinguished Executive (Clinton Administration)
- 1995 Senior Executives Association Executive Excellence Award for Distinguished Service
- 1993 Presidential Rank Award of Meritorious Executive (Bush Administration)
- 1993 Outstanding Leadership Medal
- 1991 Presidential Rank Award of Distinguished Executive (Bush Administration)
- 1989 Named Director of the John C. Stennis Space Center
- 1987 Presidential Rank Award of Meritorious Executive (Reagan Administration)
- 1987 NASA Equal Employment Opportunity Medal
- 1980 Named Deputy Director of the John C. Stennis Space Center
- 1974 Citizen of the Year, City of Picayune, Mississippi
- 1966 Scout Master of Troup 87 Picayune, Mississippi
- 1966 Began Career as a Test Engineer at Stennis Space Center
- 1960 Graduate of Mississippi State University - Bachelor of Science Degree in Aeronautical Engineering
- 1958 Piano Player in the Rock-n-Roll group, The Rolling Stones, at Mississippi State University.

== Professional memberships ==
- 1992 Alumni Fellow College of Engineering, Mississippi State University
- Member and past chairman of the advisory committee to the College of Engineering of Mississippi State University
- Tau Beta Pi
- American Institute of Aeronautics and Astronautics
- Mississippi Academy of Sciences
- National Space Club
- Register Professional Engineer State of Mississippi
