= NASA Astronaut Group 15 =

1994 human spaceflight selection of 23 candidates; "The Flying Escargot"

The Flying Escargot
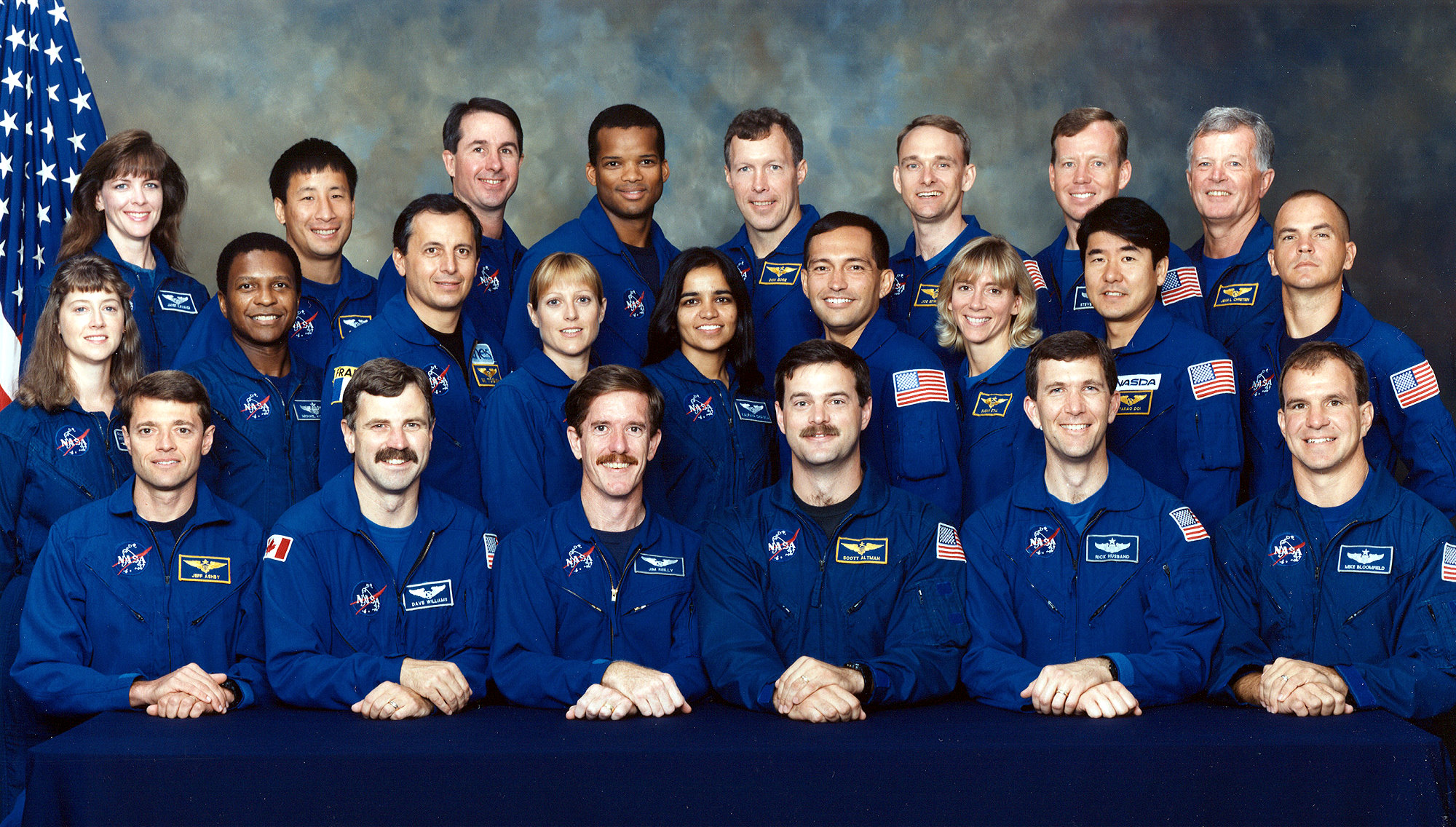
- The astronauts of Group 15
- Year selected: 1994
- Number selected: 23

NASA Astronaut Group 15 (nicknamed "The Flying Escargot") was a group of 23 NASA astronauts announced on December 8, 1994. Group members adopted The Flying Escargot as their moniker, in reference to two members of the group being from France. The group featured ten pilots, nine mission specialists, and four international mission specialist trainees from France, Canada and Japan.

Three members of this group, Rick Husband, Michael P. Anderson, and Kalpana Chawla, died in the Space Shuttle Columbia disaster. These three received the Congressional Space Medal of Honor.

Another member of the group Pamela Melroy, served as Deputy Administrator of NASA from 2021 to 2025, having been appointed by US President Joe Biden.

== Pilots ==
- Scott Altman (4 flights)
  - Pilot, STS-90 Columbia (Neurolab)
  - Pilot, STS-106 Atlantis
  - Commander, STS-109 Columbia
  - Commander, STS-125 Atlantis
- Jeffrey Ashby (3 flights)
  - Pilot, STS-93 Columbia
  - Pilot, STS-100 Endeavour
  - Commander, STS-112 Atlantis
- Michael Bloomfield (3 flights)
  - Pilot, STS-86 Atlantis
  - Pilot, STS-97 Endeavour
  - Commander, STS-110 Atlantis
- Joe F. Edwards, Jr. (1 flight)
  - Pilot, STS-89 Endeavour
- Dominic L. Pudwill Gorie (4 flights)
  - Pilot, STS-91 Discovery
  - Pilot, STS-99 Endeavour
  - Commander, STS-108 Endeavour
  - Commander, STS-123 Endeavour
- Rick Husband (2 flights)
  - Pilot, STS-96 Discovery
  - Commander, STS-107 Columbia†
- Steven Lindsey (5 flights)
  - Pilot, STS-87 Columbia
  - Pilot, STS-95 Discovery
  - Commander, STS-104 Atlantis
  - Commander, STS-121 Discovery
  - Commander, STS-133 Discovery
- Pamela Melroy (3 flights)
  - Pilot, STS-92 Discovery
  - Pilot, STS-112 Atlantis
  - Commander, STS-120 Discovery
- Susan L. Still-Kilrain (2 flights)
  - Pilot, STS-83 Columbia
  - Pilot, STS-94 Columbia
- Frederick Sturckow (4 flights)
  - Pilot, STS-88 Endeavour
  - Pilot, STS-105 Discovery
  - Commander, STS-117 Atlantis
  - Commander, STS-128 Discovery

== Mission Specialists ==
- Michael P. Anderson (2 flights)
  - Mission Specialist, STS-89 Endeavour
  - Mission Specialist, STS-107 Columbia†
- Kalpana Chawla (2 flights)
  - Mission Specialist, STS-87 Columbia
  - Mission Specialist, STS-107 Columbia†
- Robert Curbeam (3 flights)
  - Mission Specialist, STS-85 Discovery
  - Mission Specialist, STS-98 Atlantis
  - Mission Specialist, STS-116 Discovery
- Kathryn Hire (2 flights)
  - Mission Specialist, STS-90 Columbia
  - Mission Specialist, STS-130 Endeavour
- Janet Kavandi (3 flights)
  - STS-91 Discovery
  - STS-99 Endeavour
  - STS-104 Atlantis
- Edward Tsang Lu (3 flights)
  - Mission Specialist, STS-84 Atlantis
  - Mission Specialist, STS-106 Atlantis
  - Flight Engineer, Soyuz TMA-2 - Flight Engineer, Expedition 7
- Carlos I. Noriega (2 flights)
  - Mission Specialist, STS-84 Atlantis
  - Mission Specialist, STS-97 Endeavour
- James F. Reilly (3 flights)
  - STS-89 Endeavour
  - STS-104 Atlantis
  - STS-117 Atlantis
- Stephen Robinson (4 flights)
  - STS-85 Discovery
  - STS-95 Discovery
  - STS-114 Discovery
  - STS-130 Endeavour

== International mission specialists ==
- Jean-Loup Chrétien (France) (3 flights)
  - Research Cosmonaut, Soyuz T-6
  - Research Cosmonaut, Soyuz TM-6/TM-7 (Mir Aragatz)
  - Mission Specialist, STS-86 Atlantis
- Takao Doi (Japan) (2 flights)
  - Mission Specialist, STS-87 Columbia
  - Mission Specialist, STS-123 Endeavour
- Michel Tognini (France) (2 flights)
  - Research Cosmonaut, Soyuz TM-15/TM-14
  - Mission Specialist, STS-93 Columbia
- Dafydd Williams (Canada) (2 flights)
  - Mission Specialist, STS-90 Columbia
  - Mission Specialist, STS-118 Endeavour

== See also ==
- List of astronauts by year of selection
