= STS-85 =

1997 American crewed spaceflight mission to support multiple space science packages

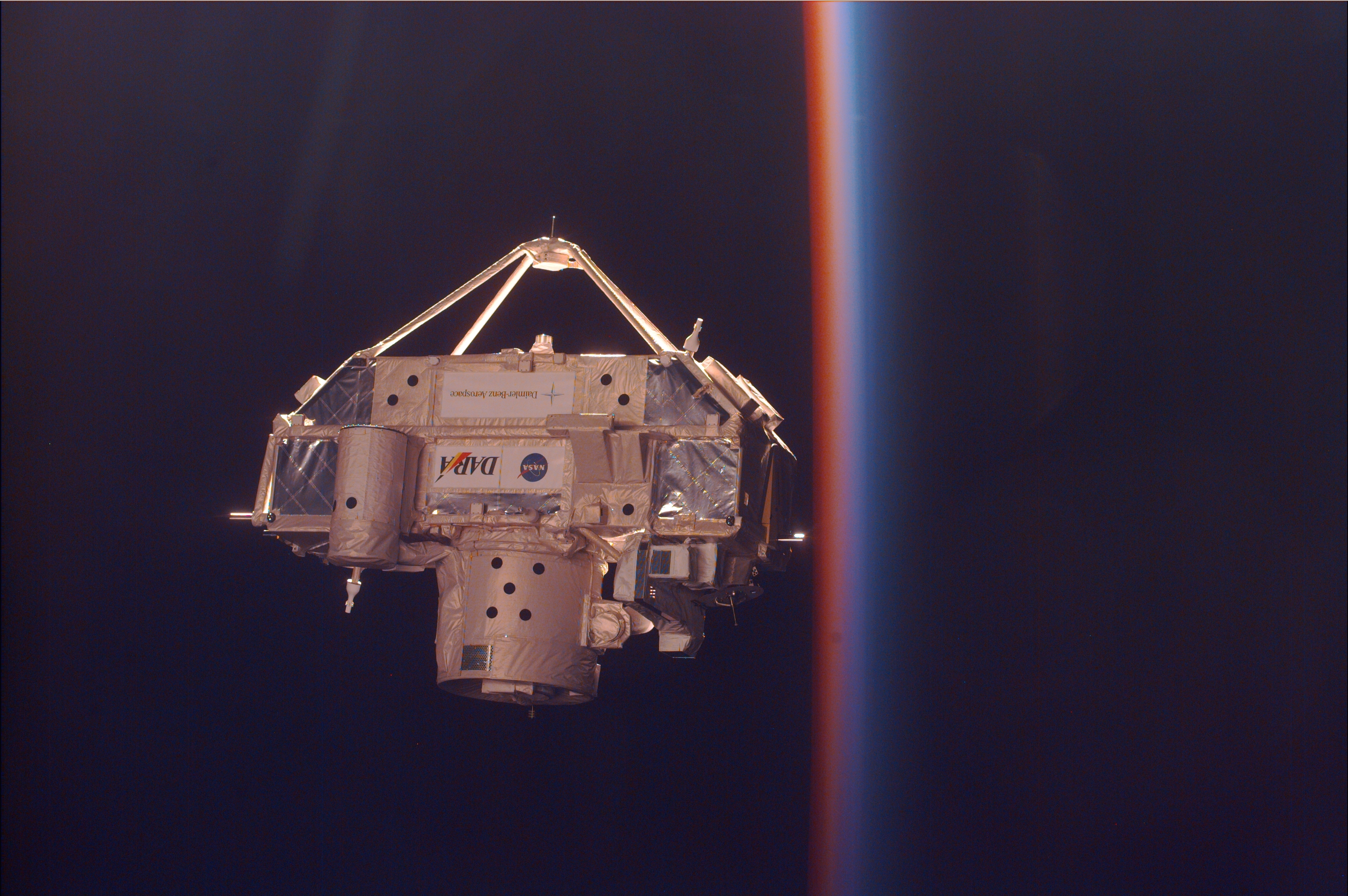
- The CRISTA-SPAS experiment in its ninth and final day of free flight in proximity to Discovery
- Names: Space Transportation System-85
- Mission type: Research
- Operator: NASA
- COSPAR ID: 1997-039A
- SATCAT no.: 24889
- Mission duration: 11 days, 20 hours, 28 minutes, 7 seconds
- Distance travelled: 7,600,000 kilometres (4,700,000 mi)
- Orbits completed: 185

Spacecraft properties
- Spacecraft: Space Shuttle Discovery
- Payload mass: 9,191 kilograms (20,263 lb)

Crew
- Crew size: 6
- Members: Curtis L. Brown, Jr.; Kent V. Rominger; N. Jan Davis; Robert L. Curbeam, Jr.; Stephen K. Robinson; Bjarni V. Tryggvason

Start of mission
- Launch date: 7 August 1997, 14:41 UTC
- Launch site: Kennedy, LC-39A

End of mission
- Landing date: 19 August 1997, 11:08 UTC
- Landing site: Kennedy, SLF Runway 33

Orbital parameters
- Reference system: Geocentric
- Regime: Low Earth
- Perigee altitude: 249 kilometres (155 mi)
- Apogee altitude: 261 kilometres (162 mi)
- Inclination: 57.0 degrees
- Period: 89.6 minutes
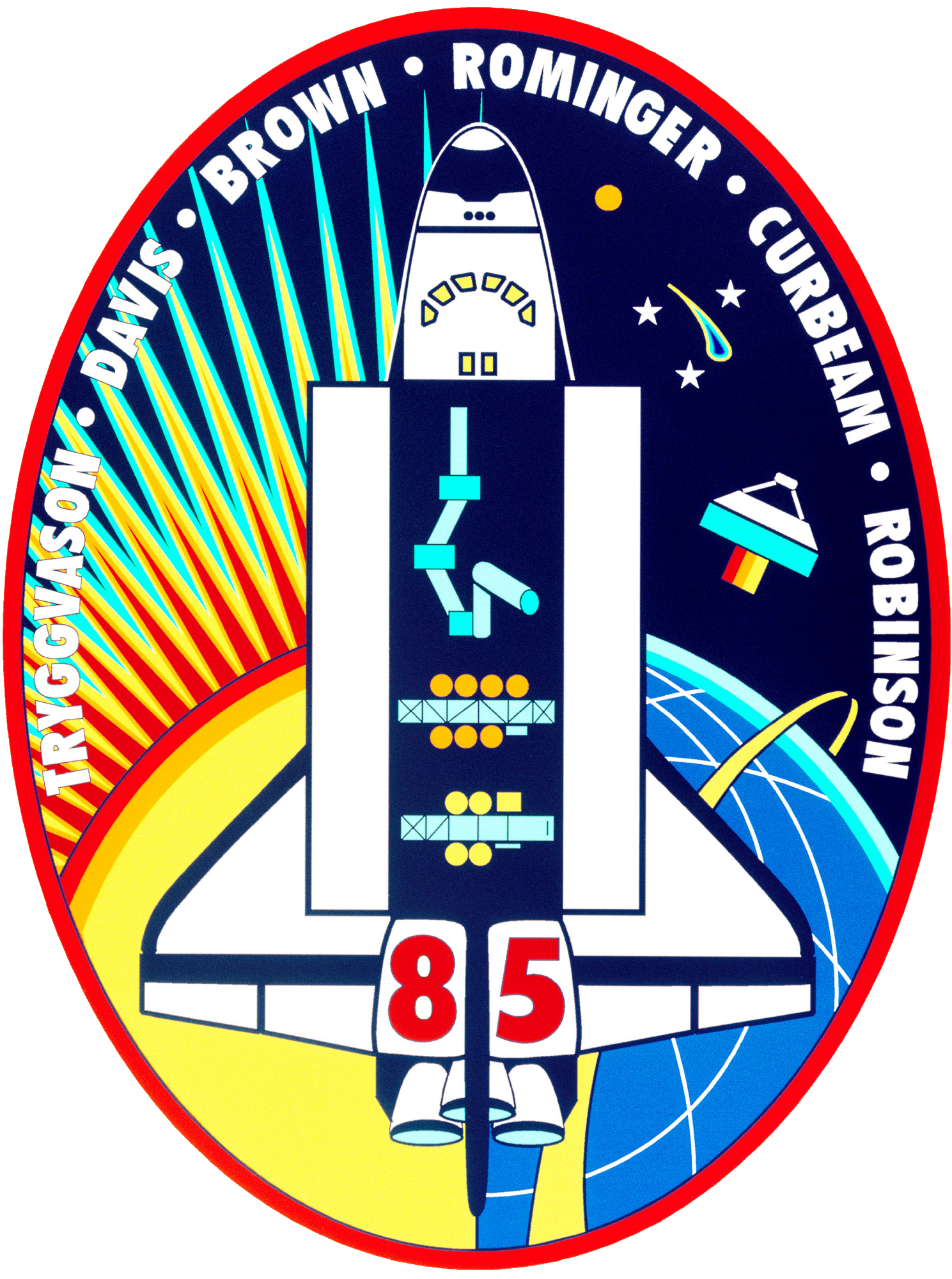
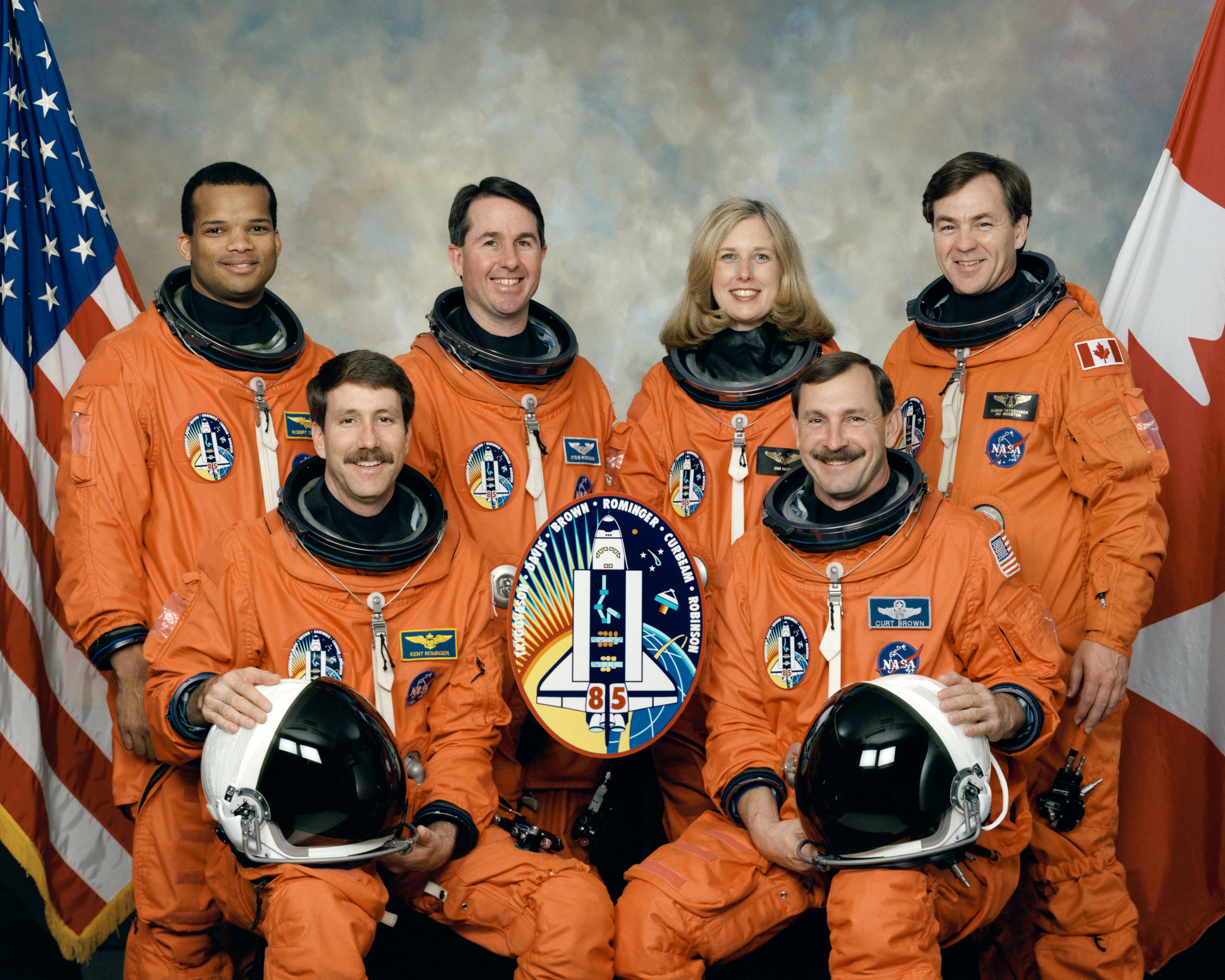
- STS-85 mission patch Left to right – Seated: Rominger, Brown; Standing: Curbeam, Robinson, Davis, Tryggvason Space Shuttle program

STS-85 was the 23rd flight of Space Shuttle Discovery that performed multiple space science packages. It was launched from Kennedy Space Center, Florida, on 7 August 1997. The main STS-85 payloads included the satellite known as Cryogenic Infrared Spectrometers and Telescopes for the Atmosphere-Shuttle Pallet Satellite-2 CRISTA-SPAS-02.

== Crew ==
Position	Astronaut
Commander	Curtis L. Brown, Jr. Fourth spaceflight
Pilot	Kent V. Rominger; Third spaceflight
Mission Specialist 1	N. Jan Davis; Third and last spaceflight
Mission Specialist 2 Flight Engineer	Robert L. Curbeam, Jr. First spaceflight
Mission Specialist 3	Stephen K. Robinson; First spaceflight
Payload Specialist 1	Bjarni V. Tryggvason, CSA; Only spaceflight

Jeffrey Ashby was originally assigned to be pilot on this mission, but asked to be relieved in order to take care of his wife, who was dying from cancer. He was replaced by Kent Rominger and was assigned to pilot STS-93 instead. The launch occurred on Rominger's 41st birthday.

=== Crew seat assignments ===
Seat	Launch	Landing	Seats 1–4 are on the flight deck. Seats 5–7 are on the mid-deck.
1	Brown		Seats 1–4 are on the flight deck. Seats 5–7 are on the mid-deck.
2	Rominger		Seats 1–4 are on the flight deck. Seats 5–7 are on the mid-deck.
3	Davis	Robinson	Seats 1–4 are on the flight deck. Seats 5–7 are on the mid-deck.
4	Curbeam		Seats 1–4 are on the flight deck. Seats 5–7 are on the mid-deck.
5	Robinson	Davis	Seats 1–4 are on the flight deck. Seats 5–7 are on the mid-deck.
6	Tryggvason		Seats 1–4 are on the flight deck. Seats 5–7 are on the mid-deck.
7	Unused		Seats 1–4 are on the flight deck. Seats 5–7 are on the mid-deck.

== Mission highlights ==
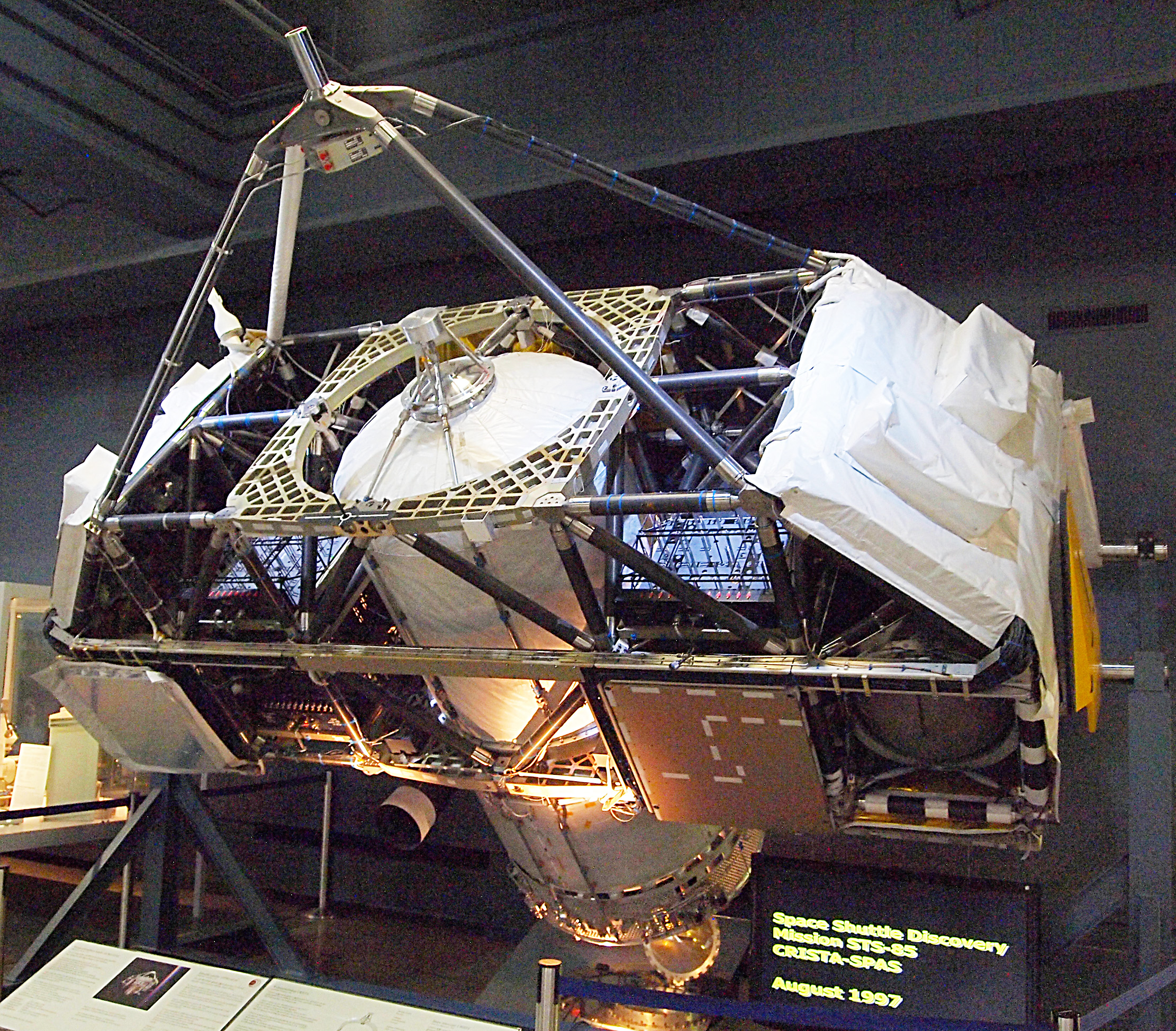
CRISTA-SPAS

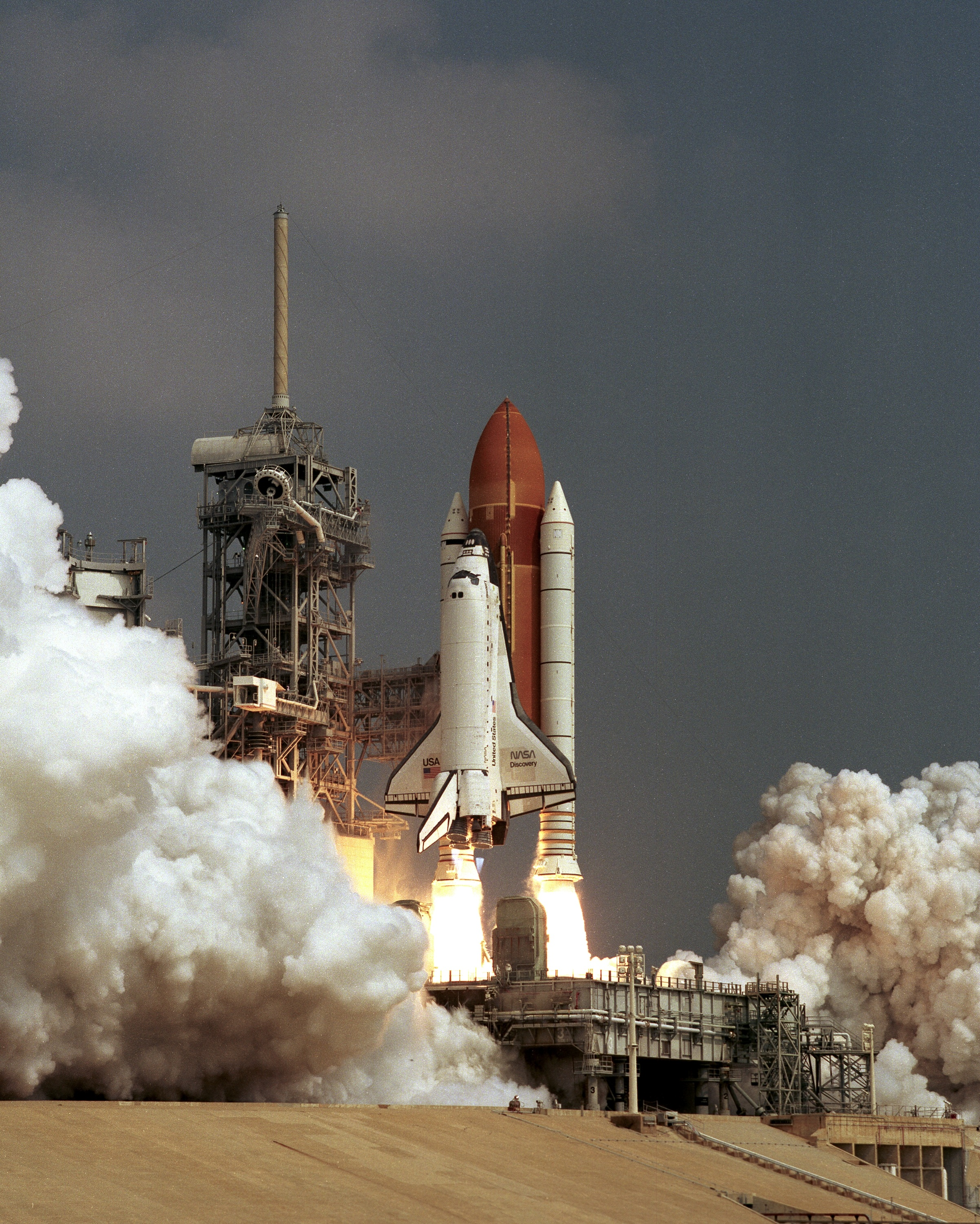
Launch of STS-85

The deployment and retrieval of a satellite designed to study Earth's middle atmosphere along with a test of potential International Space Station hardware highlighted NASA's sixth Shuttle mission of 1997. The prime payload for the flight, the Cryogenic Infrared Spectrometers and Telescopes for the Atmosphere-Shuttle Pallet Satellite-2 (CRISTA-SPAS-2) made its second flight on the Space Shuttle (previous flight STS-66 in 1994) and was the fourth mission in a cooperative venture between the German Space Agency (DARA) and NASA.

During the flight, Davis used Discovery's robot arm to deploy the CRISTA-SPAS payload for about 9 days of free-flight. CRISTA-SPAS consists of three telescopes and four spectrometers that measured trace gases and dynamics of the Earth's middle atmosphere. Davis also operated the robot arm for CRISTA-SPAS retrieval. The Shuttle Pallet Satellite (SPAS) on which the scientific instruments were mounted is a self-contained platform that provides power, command, control and communication with Discovery during free-flight.

Two other instruments mounted on the SPAS also studied the Earth's atmosphere. The Middle Atmosphere High Resolution Spectrograph Instrument (MAHRSI) measured hydroxyl and nitric oxide by sensing UV radiation emitted and scattered by the atmosphere, while the Surface Effects Sample Monitor (SESAM) was a passive carrier for state-of-the-art optical surfaces to study the impact of the atomic oxygen and the space environment on materials and services.

The crew also supported the Manipulator Flight Demonstration (MFD) experiment being sponsored by NASDA, the Japanese Space Agency. MFD consists of three separate experiments located on a support truss in the payload bay. The primary objective was to demonstrate the newly designed dexterous robot arm in the space environment, before installing on the Japanese Experiment Module (JEM) of the International Space Station.

Several Hitchhiker payloads, including the Technology Applications and Science Payload (TAS-01), the International Extreme Ultraviolet Hitchhiker (IEH-02), and the Ultraviolet Spectrograph Telescope for Astronomical Research (UVSTAR) were housed in Discovery's payload bay, operating independently of crew support during the flight.

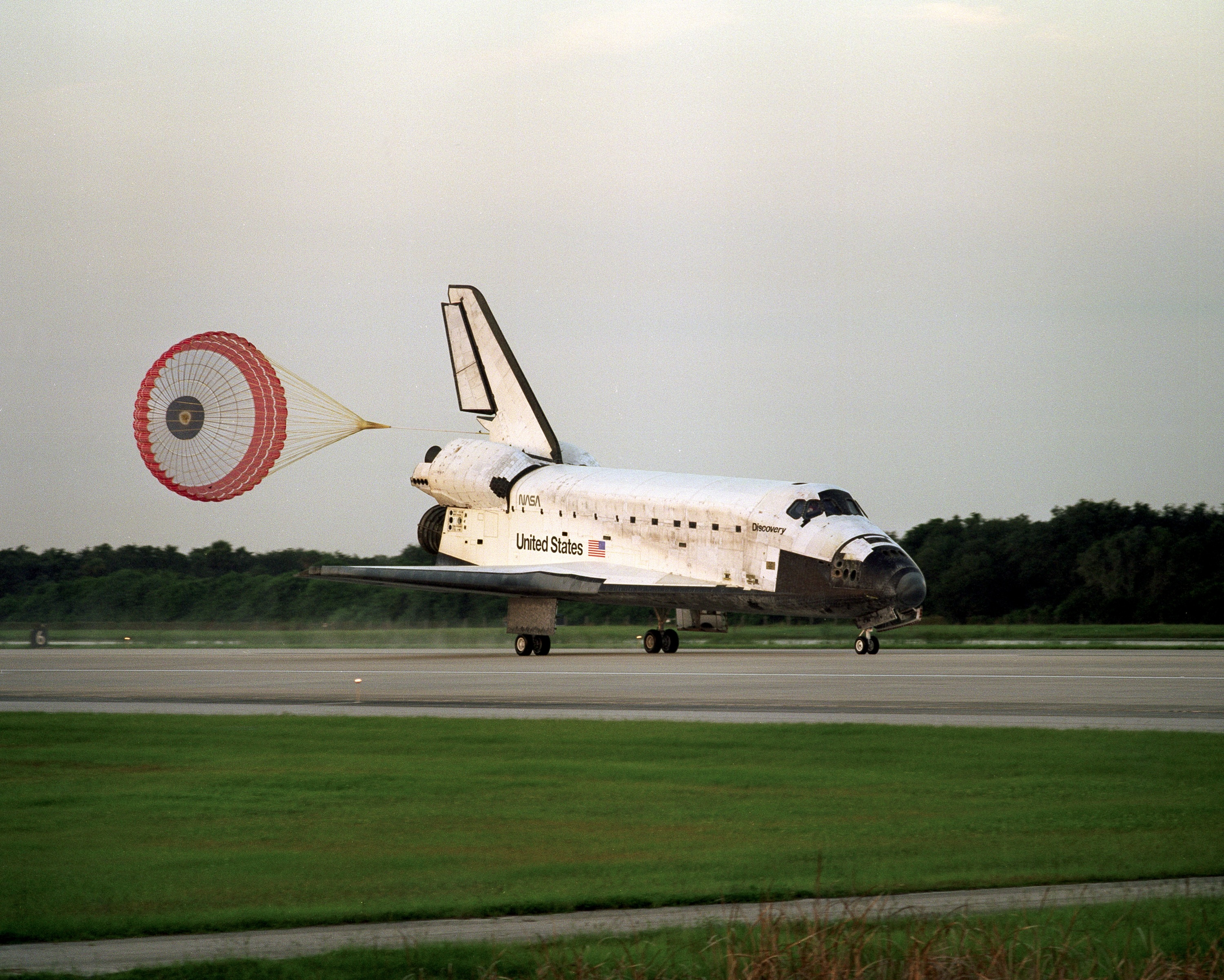
STS-85 lands at the Shuttle Landing Facility, 19 August 1997.

The Microgravity Vibration Isolation Mount (MIM) experiment was operated by Canadian Space Agency astronaut Bjarni Tryggvason. The MIM experiment is a small double-locker size device designed to isolate International Space Station payloads and experiments from disturbances created by thruster firings or crew activity. MIM was operated for 30 hours with real-time data transmission to investigators on the ground. (Reference NASA Press Release 96–224)

Another experiment onboard STS-85 was the Southwest Ultraviolet Imaging System (SWUIS-01) from the Southwest Research Institute (SwRI) along with scientific collaborators from JPL, APL, and the University of Maryland. SWUIS (pronounced, "Swiss") is a wide-field UV imager to which was used to observe comet Hale-Bopp. It is based around an 18-cm Maksutov UV telescope and a UV-sensitive, Xybion image-intensified CCD camera that frames at video rates (30 Hz). Each SWUIS observation period lasted approximately 3 hours, and garnered approximately 10^5 images in up to 7 filter bandpasses. SWUIS was operated from a 2-axis mount inside the Shuttle mid-deck cockpit, and looked out of the Shuttle through a quartz window. SWUIS can be pointed anywhere in a 4.5 deg cone around the centerline of the comet. Mission specialists set up and operated the instrument.

On Day 8, the crew was awakened by the song "You Will Go to the Moon" by Canadian artists Moxy Früvous, selected by astronaut Marc Garneau, the first Canadian in space.

The mission lasted a day longer than originally planned due to a threat of ground fog at Kennedy Space Center.

== Media ==
STS-85 launches (40 secs)

STS-85 prepares to land (30 secs)

STS-85 lands (38 secs)

== See also ==
- List of human spaceflights
- List of Space Shuttle missions
- Outline of space science
