= Curtis Brown =

American astronaut (born 1956)

Curt Brown
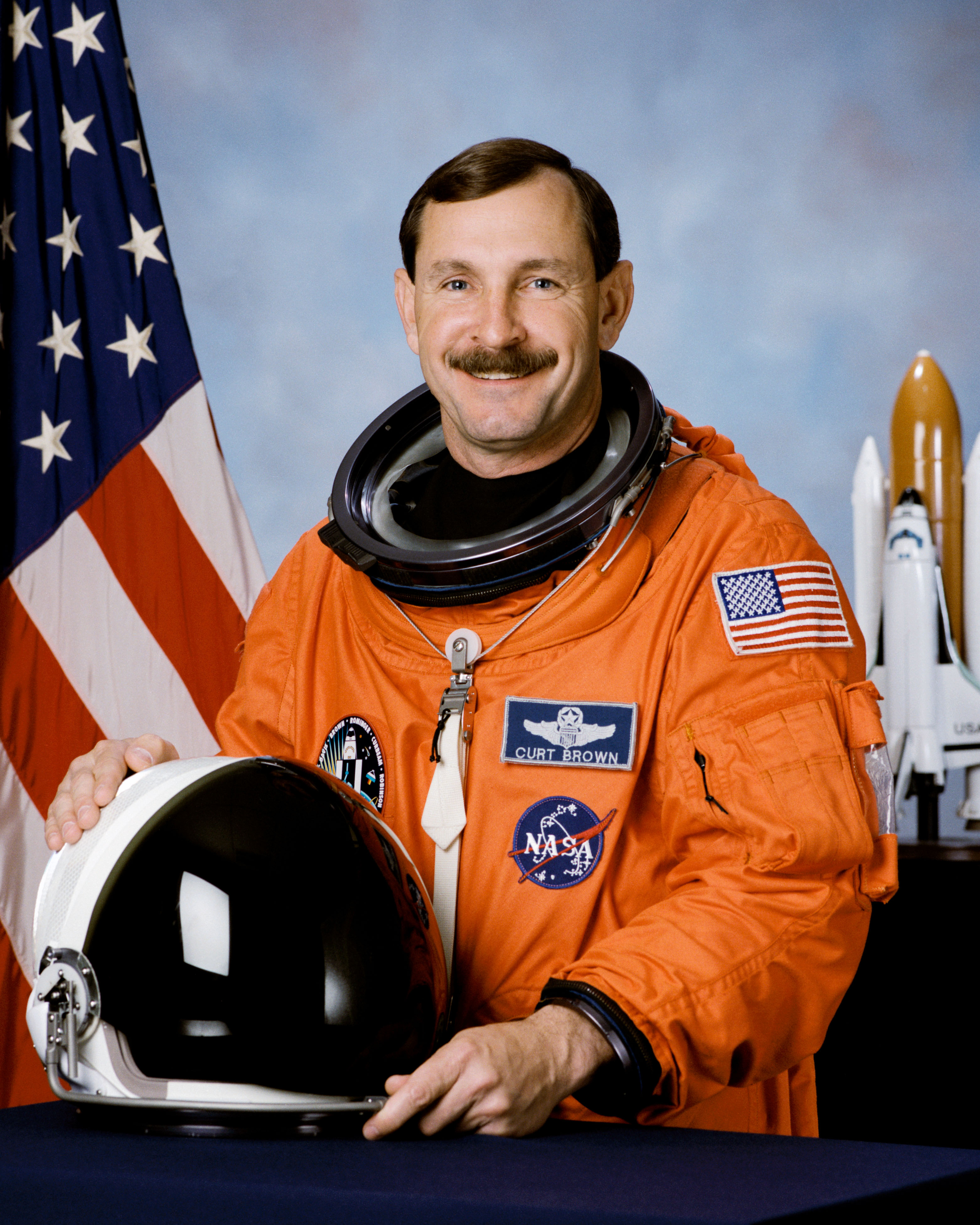
- Born: Curtis Lee Brown Jr. March 11, 1956 (age 70); Elizabethtown, North Carolina, U.S.
- Education: United States Air Force Academy (BS)
- Space career

NASA astronaut
- Rank: Colonel, USAF
- Time in space: 57d 17h 7m
- Selection: NASA Group 12 (1987)
- Missions: STS-47; STS-66; STS-77; STS-85; STS-95; STS-103
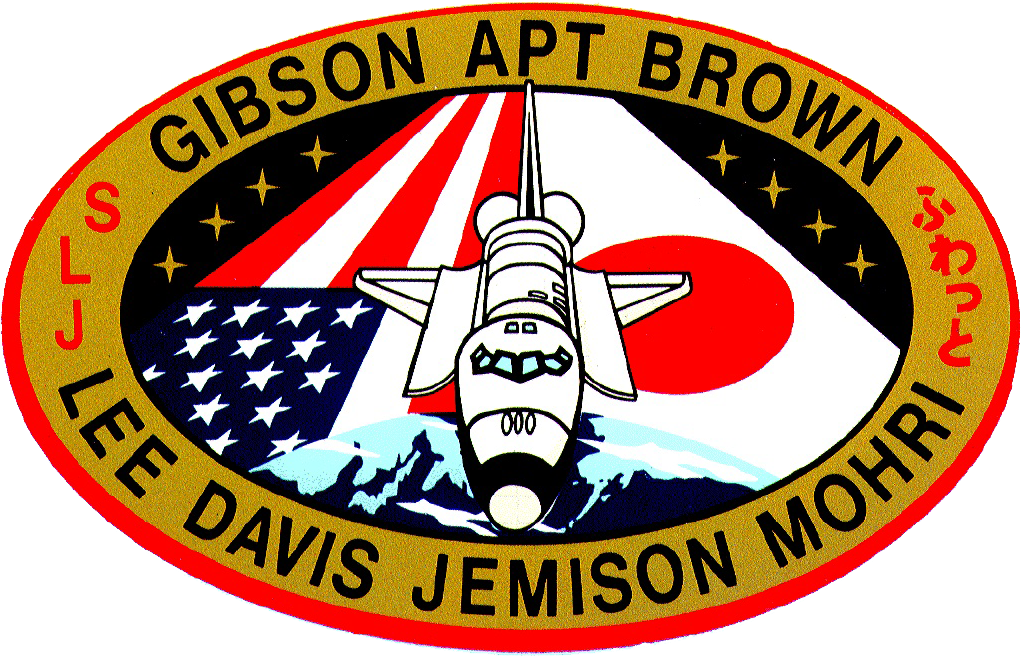
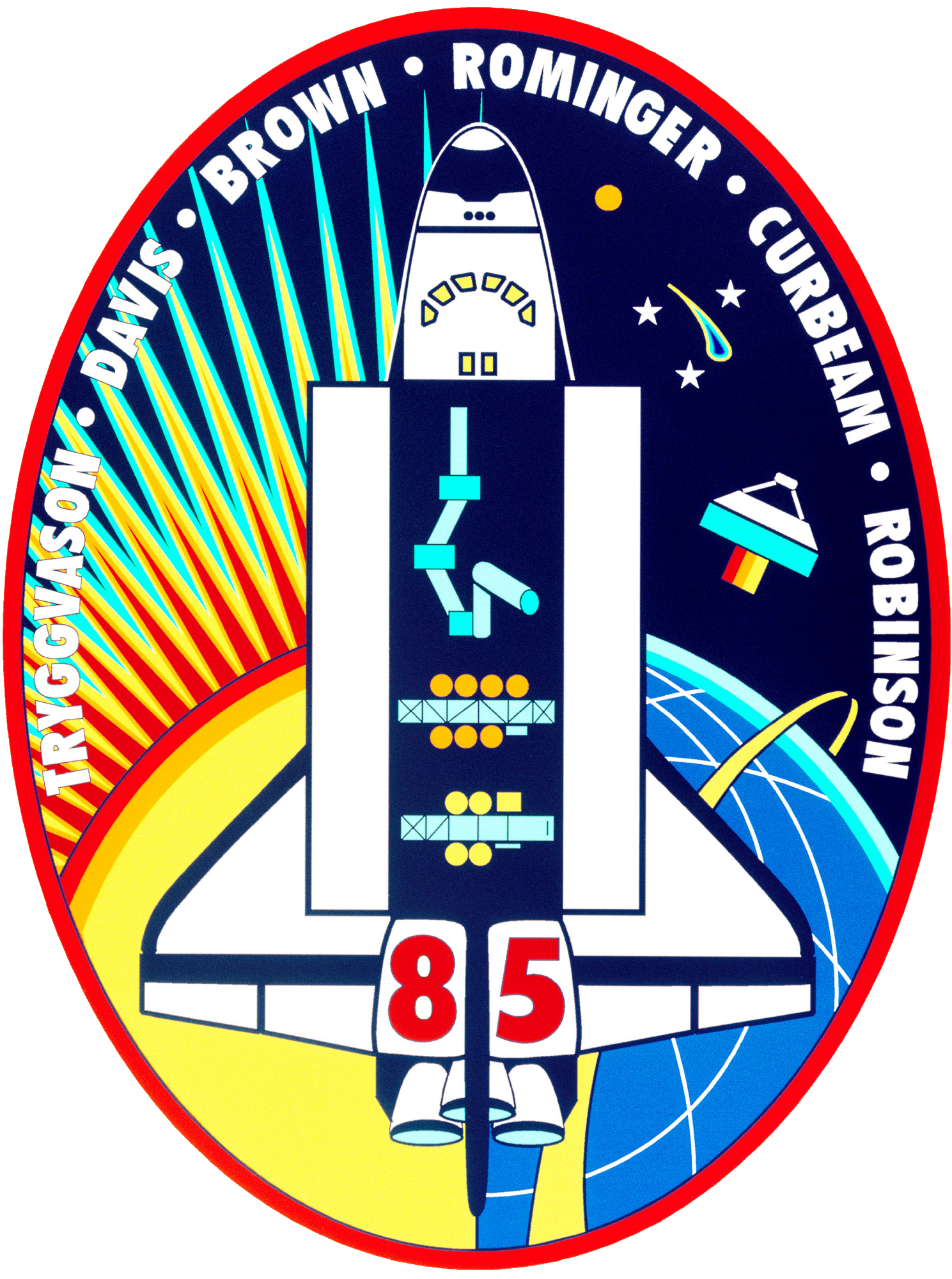
- Mission insignia

Curtis Lee Brown Jr. (born March 11, 1956) is a former NASA astronaut and retired United States Air Force colonel.

== Background ==
Colonel Brown was born March 11, 1956. He graduated from East Bladen High School in Elizabethtown, North Carolina in 1974 and received a Bachelor of Science degree in electrical engineering from the United States Air Force Academy in 1978.

He is a member of the United States Air Force Association, the United States Air Force Academy Association of Graduates, and the Experimental Aircraft Association.

== Military service ==
He was commissioned a Second Lieutenant at the United States Air Force Academy in Colorado Springs, Colorado, in 1978, and completed Undergraduate Pilot Training at Laughlin Air Force Base in Del Rio, Texas. He graduated in July 1979 and was assigned to fly A-10 aircraft at Myrtle Beach Air Force Base, South Carolina, arriving there in January 1980 after completing A-10 training at Davis-Monthan Air Force Base, Arizona. In March 1982, he was reassigned to Davis-Monthan AFB as an instructor pilot in the A-10.

In January 1983, he attended USAF Fighter Weapons School at Nellis Air Force Base, Nevada and returned to Davis-Monthan AFB as an instructor in A-10 weapons and tactics. In June 1985, he attended USAF Test Pilot School at Edwards Air Force Base, California. Upon graduation in June 1986, Brown was assigned to Eglin Air Force Base, Florida, where he served as a test pilot in the A-10 and F-16 aircraft until his selection for the astronaut program.

He has logged over 6,000 hours flight time in jet aircraft.

== NASA ==
Selected as an astronaut candidate by NASA in June 1987, Brown completed a one-year training and evaluation program in August 1988, and is qualified for flight assignment as a pilot. Technical assignments have included: involvement in the upgrade of the Shuttle Mission Simulator (SMS), development of the Flight Data File (FDF), lead of the astronaut launch support team responsible for crew ingress/strap-in prior to launch and crew egress after landing; monitored the refurbishment of OV-102 and OV-103 during ground turnaround processing; lead spacecraft communicator (CAPCOM), Astronaut Office Lead of Shuttle Operations, and Deputy Director, Flight Crew Operations Directorate.

=== Space flights ===
A veteran of six space flights, Brown has logged over 1,383 hours in space. He was the pilot on STS-47 in 1992, STS-66 in 1994 and STS-77 in 1996, and was spacecraft commander on STS-85 in 1997, STS-95 in 1998, and STS-103 in 1999.

==== STS-47 ====
Brown's first spaceflight was STS-47 aboard the Space Shuttle Endeavour. The mission launched September 12, 1992 14:23 (UTC) and was an eight-day cooperative mission between the United States and Japan focused on life science and materials processing experiments in space. After completing 126 orbits of Earth, the mission ended with the Endeavour landing at the Shuttle Landing Facility in Florida, September 20, 1992 12:53 (UTC). Mission duration was 190 hours, 30 minutes, 23 seconds.

==== STS-66 ====
For Brown's second spaceflight, STS-66, he piloted the Space Shuttle Atlantis. The mission lifted off from Launch Complex 39B November 3, 1994 16:59 (UTC). was the Atmospheric Laboratory for Applications and Science 3 (ATLAS-3) mission. ATLAS-3 was part of an ongoing program to determine the Earth's energy balance and atmospheric change over an 11-year solar cycle. Following 175 orbits of the Earth, the 11-day mission ended with the Atlantis landing at Edwards Air Force Base, California, November 14, 1994 15:34 (UTC). Mission duration was 262 hours and 34 minutes.

==== STS-77 ====
Brown served as pilot for the third time during STS-77 aboard the Space Shuttle Endeavour. Lift-off of the ten-day mission occurred May 19, 1996 10:30 (UTC). The crew performed a record number of rendezvous sequences (one with a SPARTAN satellite and three with a deployed Satellite Test Unit) and approximately 21 hours of formation flying in proximity of the satellites. During the flight the crew also conducted 12 materials processing, fluid dynamics, and biotechnology experiments in a Spacehab Module. STS-77 deployed and retrieved a SPARTAN satellite, which carried the Inflatable Antenna Experiment designed to test the concept of large, inflatable space structures. A small Satellite Test Unit was also deployed to test the concept of self-stabilization by using aerodynamic forces and magnetic damping. The mission was concluded in 160 Earth orbits, with a landing at the Shuttle Landing Facility May 29, 1996 11:10 (UTC) after traveling 4.1 million miles in 240 hours and 39 minutes.

==== STS-85 ====
Brown's first command and fourth spaceflight was STS-85 aboard the Space Shuttle Discovery. The shuttle lifted off from Launch Complex 39A August 7, 1997 14:41 (UTC) on a 12-day mission during which the crew deployed and retrieved the CRISTA-SPAS payload, operated the Japanese Manipulator Flight Demonstration (MFD) robotic arm, studied changes in the Earth's atmosphere and tested technology destined for use on the future International Space Station. The mission was accomplished in 189 Earth orbits, and concluded with a landing at the Shuttle Landing Facility August 19, 1997 11:08 (UTC) after traveling 4.7 million miles in 284 hours and 27 minutes.

==== STS-95 ====
Brown flew in space for the fifth time during STS-95 as commander aboard the Space Shuttle Discovery. Lifting off from Launch Complex 39B October 29, 1998 19:19 (UTC), STS-95 was a 9-day mission during which the crew supported a variety of research payloads including deployment of the Spartan solar-observing spacecraft, the Hubble Space Telescope Orbital Systems Test Platform, and investigations on space flight and the aging process. The mission was accomplished in 134 Earth orbits, touching down at the Shuttle Landing Facility November 7, 1998 17:04 (UTC) after traveling 3.6 million miles in 213 hours and 44 minutes. The mission was highly publicized for the return of 77-year-old Senator John Glenn's return to space after 38 years. This flight made Brown the only astronaut besides Tom Stafford to have commanded a member of the Mercury 7 on a mission.

==== STS-103 ====
Brown's sixth and final spaceflight was STS-103 as commander aboard the Space Shuttle Discovery. Lifting off from Launch Complex 39A December 20, 1999 00:50 (UTC), STS-103 was an 8-day mission during which the crew successfully installed new instruments and upgraded systems on the Hubble Space Telescope (HST). Enhancing HST scientific capabilities required three space walks. The STS-103 mission was accomplished in 120 Earth orbits, touching down at the Shuttle Landing Facility December 28, 1999 00:01 (UTC) after traveling 3.2 million miles in 191 hours and 11 minutes.

== Post-NASA career ==
Brown left NASA in May 2000 and became an airline pilot for American Airlines and later Sun Country Airlines. He was inducted into the Astronaut Hall of Fame in April 2013. He is currently the chairman of the board of the directors of the Astronaut Scholarship Foundation.

== Awards and decorations ==
- Distinguished Flying Cross
- Defense Superior Service Medal
- Defense Meritorious Service Medal (2x)
- Air Force Meritorious Service Medal
- Air Force Commendation Medal
- Air Force Achievement Medal
- NASA Space Flight Medal (6x)

== See also ==
- List of Space Shuttle missions
