= Steven Lindsey =

American astronaut and U.S. Air Force officer (born 1960)

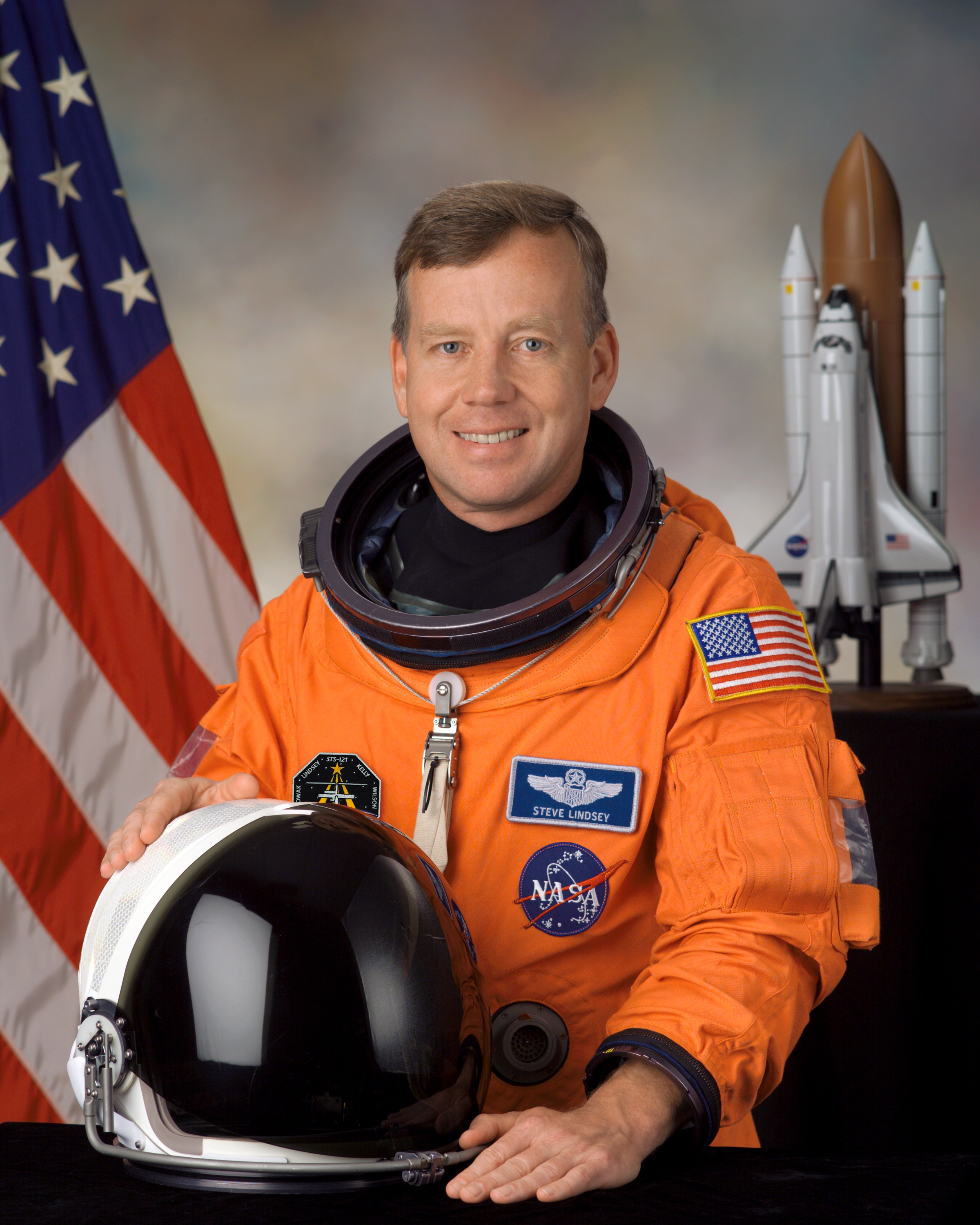
- Born: Steven Wayne Lindsey; August 24, 1960 (age 66); Temple City, California, U.S.
- Education: United States Air Force Academy (BS); Air University (MS)
- Awards: Distinguished Flying Cross
- Space career

NASA astronaut
- Rank: Colonel, USAF
- Time in space: 62d 22h 33m
- Selection: NASA Group 15 (1994)
- Missions: STS-87; STS-95; STS-104; STS-121; STS-133

Steven Wayne Lindsey (born August 24, 1960) is a retired U.S. Air Force officer and NASA astronaut. Lindsey served as Chief of the NASA Astronaut Office from September 2006 until October 2009.

== Early life and education ==
Lindsey was born on August 24, 1960, in Arcadia, California. He graduated from Temple City High School in 1978. Lindsey is an Eagle Scout from Troop 161. He received a Bachelor of Science degree in Engineering Sciences from the United States Air Force Academy in 1982, and a Master of Science degree in Aeronautical Engineering from the U.S. Air Force Institute of Technology of Air University in 1990.

== Military career ==
Lindsey was commissioned a Second Lieutenant at the United States Air Force Academy, Colorado Springs, Colorado, in 1982. In 1983, after receiving his pilot wings at Reese Air Force Base, Texas, he qualified in the RF-4C Phantom II and was assigned to the 12th Tactical Reconnaissance Squadron at Bergstrom Air Force Base, Texas. From 1984 until 1987, he served as a combat-ready pilot, instructor pilot, and academic instructor at Bergstrom. In 1987, he was selected to attend graduate school at the U.S. Air Force Institute of Technology, Wright-Patterson Air Force Base, Ohio, where he studied Aeronautical Engineering.

In 1989, Lindsey attended the USAF Test Pilot School at Edwards Air Force Base, California. In 1990, he was assigned to Eglin Air Force Base, Florida, where he conducted weapons and systems tests in F-16 and F-4 aircraft. While a member of the 3247th Test Squadron, Lindsey served as the Deputy Director, Advanced Tactical Airborne Reconnaissance System Joint Test Force and as the squadron's F-16 Flight Commander. In August 1993, he was selected to attend Air Command and Staff College at Maxwell Air Force Base, Alabama. Upon graduation in June 1994, he was reassigned to Eglin Air Force Base, Florida, as an Integrated Product Team leader in the USAF SEEK EAGLE Office where he was responsible for Air Force weapons certification for the F-16, F-111, A-10, and F-117 aircraft. In March 1995, he was assigned to NASA as an astronaut candidate.

Lindsey has logged over 7,000 hours of flying time in more than 50 different types of aircraft.

== NASA career ==
Lindsey was selected by NASA in March 1995. He became an astronaut in May 1996, qualified for flight assignment as a pilot. Initially assigned to flight software verification in the Shuttle Avionics Integration Laboratory (SAIL), Lindsey also served as the Astronaut Office representative working on the Multifunction Electronic Display System (MEDS) program, a glass cockpit Space Shuttle upgrade program, as well as a number of other advanced upgrade projects. In between his first two flights, he worked as the Shuttle Landing and Rollout representative responsible for training flight crews and testing orbiter landing techniques and flying qualities. After his second flight, Lindsey served as Deputy for Shuttle Operations and Co-Chairman of the Space Shuttle Cockpit Council, responsible for designing, testing, and implementing crew interfaces and displays for the $400 million Shuttle Cockpit Avionics Upgrade. More recently, he served as the Chief of International Space Station Operations for the astronaut office, responsible for integrating astronaut, civil service, and contractor activities in providing support to all aspects of the development, testing, crew training and operations of the International Space Station. After the completion of STS-121, he became Chief of the Astronaut Office. In this position, Steven also flew weather reconnaissance in the Shuttle Training Aircraft during the launch or landing of a Space Shuttle. Lindsey ceded his position as Chief of the Astronaut Office to astronaut Peggy Whitson when he was selected for STS-133.

== Spaceflight experience ==
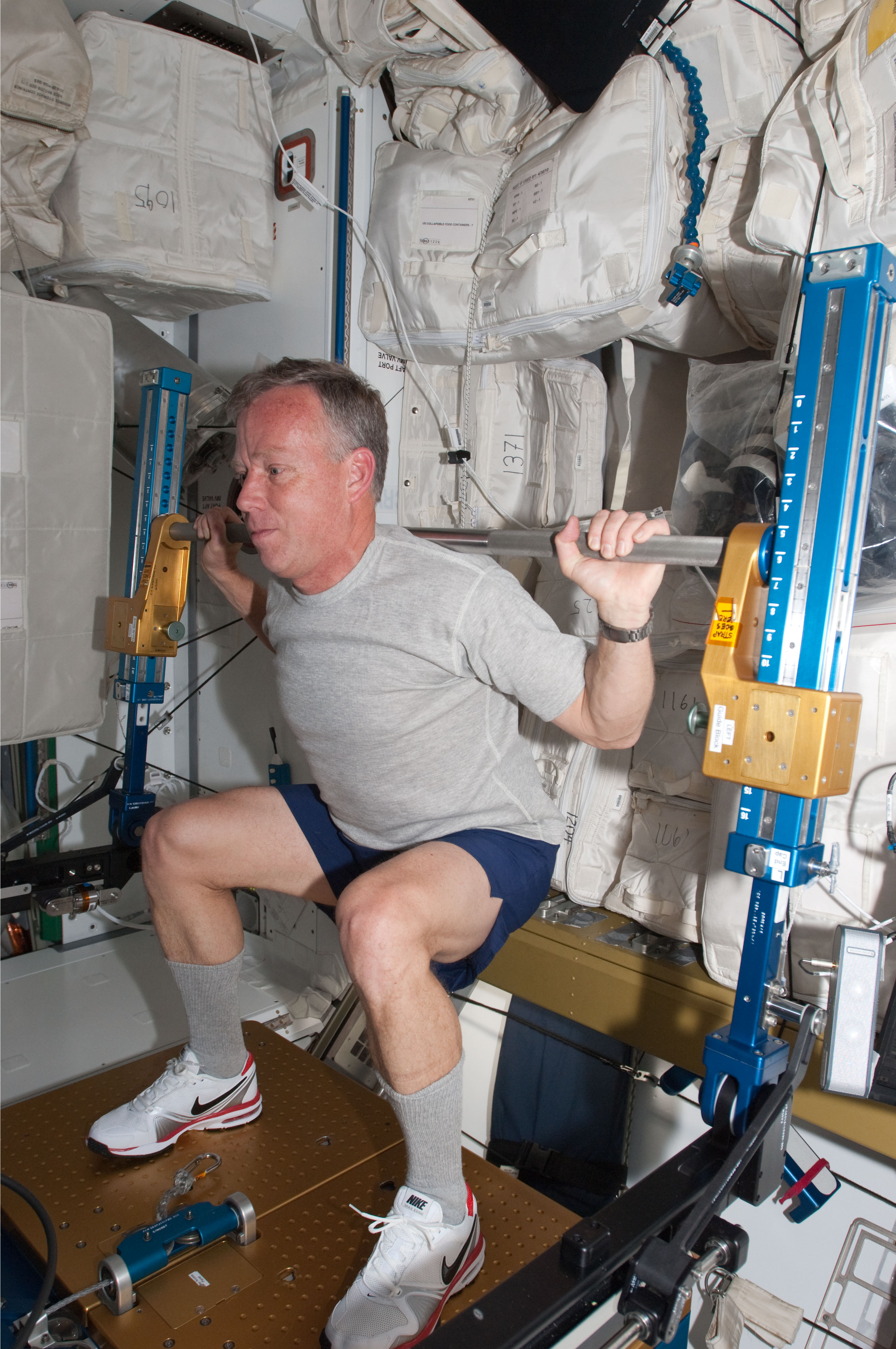
Lindsey exercises aboard the International Space Station during STS-133

Lindsey has flown five missions in space for NASA. He served as pilot of STS-87 (1997) and STS-95 (1998) and commander of STS-104 (2001), STS-121 (2006) and STS-133 (2011).

STS-87 (Columbia) (November 19 to December 5, 1997) was the fourth U.S Microgravity Payload flight and focused on experiments designed to study how the weightless environment of space affects various physical processes, and on observations of the Sun’s outer atmospheric layers. Two members of the crew performed an EVA (spacewalk) that featured the manual capture of a Spartan satellite, and tested EVA tools and procedures for future Space Station assembly. During the EVA, Lindsey piloted the first flight of the AERCam Sprint, a free-flying robotic camera. The mission was accomplished in 252 orbits of the Earth, traveling 6.5 million miles in 376 hours and 34 minutes.

STS-95 (Discovery) (October 29 to November 7, 1998) was a 9-day mission during which the crew supported a variety of research payloads including deployment and retrieval of the Spartan solar-observing spacecraft, the Hubble Space Telescope Orbital Systems Test Platform, and investigations on space flight and the aging process. The mission was accomplished in 134 Earth orbits, traveling 3.6 million miles in 213 hours and 44 minutes.

STS-104 (Atlantis) (July 12 to July 24, 2001), designated assembly mission 7A, was the 10th mission to the International Space Station (ISS). During the 13-day flight the crew conducted joint operations with the Expedition 2 crew and performed three spacewalks to install the ISS Joint Airlock Quest and to outfit it with four high-pressure gas tanks. In addition to installing and activating the Joint Airlock, the crew also performed the first spacewalk from Quest. The mission was accomplished in 200 Earth orbits.

STS-121 (Discovery) (July 4 to July 17, 2006) was an ISS visit and space shuttle checkout mission. It was the second flight after the Columbia disaster (STS-107) and was considered one of the two Return to Flight test missions before resumption of normal shuttle operations. Lindsey served as mission commander on the flight.

STS-133 (Discovery) (February 24 to March 9, 2011) was the last flight for Space Shuttle Discovery.

A veteran of five space flights, Lindsey has logged over 1,500 hours in space.

== Awards and honors ==
Lindsey is a distinguished graduate of the Air Force Undergraduate Pilot Training (1983). He is also a distinguished graduate and recipient of the Liethen-Tittle Award as the outstanding test pilot of the USAF Test Pilot School Class 89A (1989). He was awarded the Distinguished Flying Cross, the Defense Superior Service Medal, the Defense Meritorious Service Medal, 3 NASA Space Flight Medals, the NASA Outstanding Leadership Medal, the NASA Exceptional Service Medal, the Air Force Distinguished Service Medal, the Air Force Commendation Medal, the Air Force Achievement Medal and the Aerial Achievement Medal. He is an inductee into the United States Astronaut Hall of Fame.

Lindsey is a member of the Society of Experimental Test Pilots, of the USAF Academy Association of Graduates, and of the Association of Space Explorers.

Lindsey is a recipient of the Distinguished Eagle Scout Award which was presented to him by the San Gabriel Valley Council, Boy Scouts of America on November 10, 2012, on behalf of the Boy Scouts of America.

== Personal life ==
Lindsey lives in Lafayette, Colorado, with his wife, Diane Renee Lindsey (née Trujillo).

| Preceded by Kent V. Rominger | Chief of the Astronaut Office; 2006–2009 | Succeeded by Peggy Whitson |
