= Stephen Robinson =

American astronaut (born 1955)

Steve Robinson
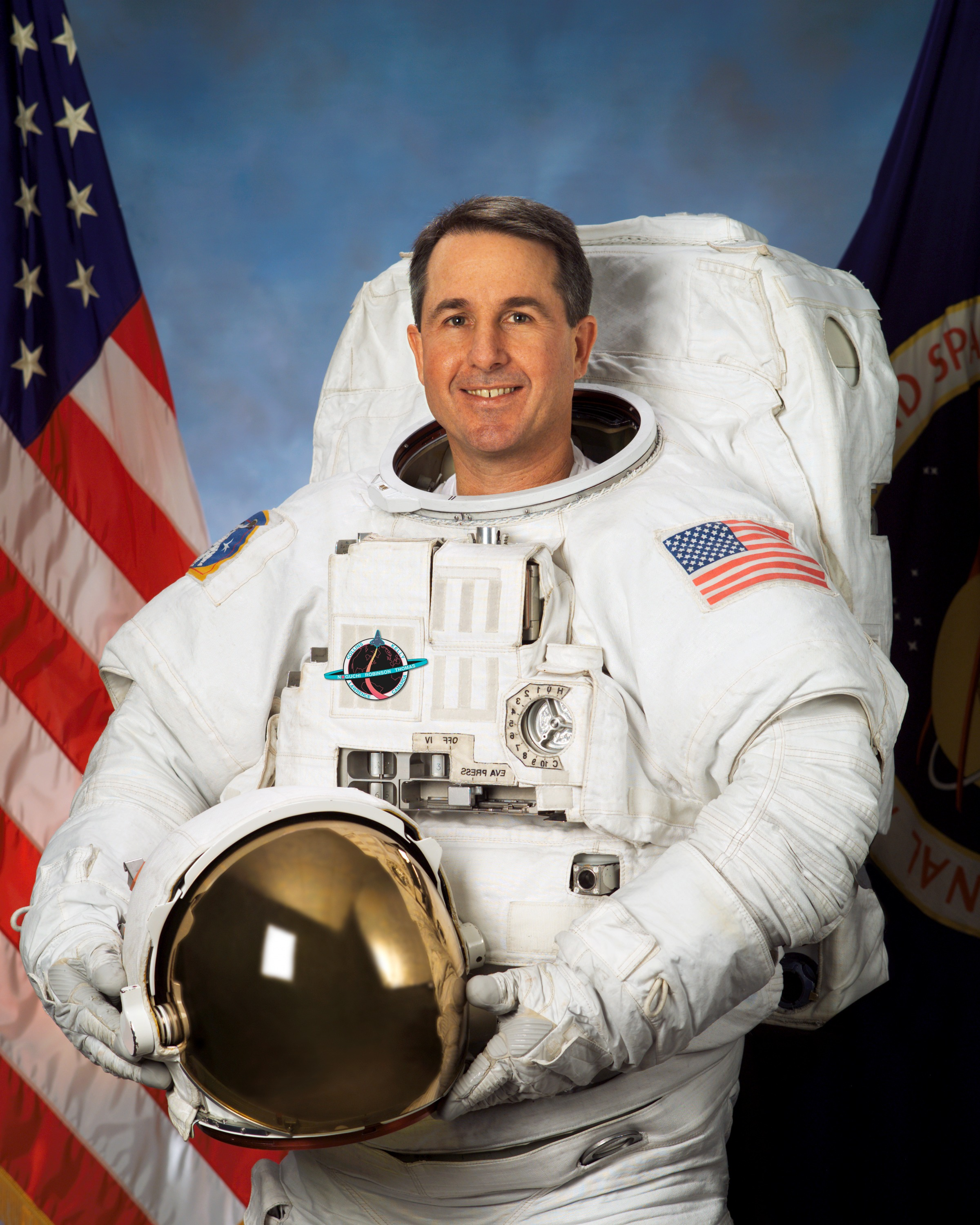
- Born: Stephen Kern Robinson; October 26, 1955 (age 70); Sacramento, California, U.S.
- Education: University of California, Davis (BS); Stanford University (MS, PhD)
- Space career

NASA astronaut
- Time in space: 48d 9h 52m
- Selection: NASA Group 15 (1994)
- Total EVAs: 3
- Total EVA time: 20h 5m
- Missions: STS-85; STS-95; STS-114; STS-130
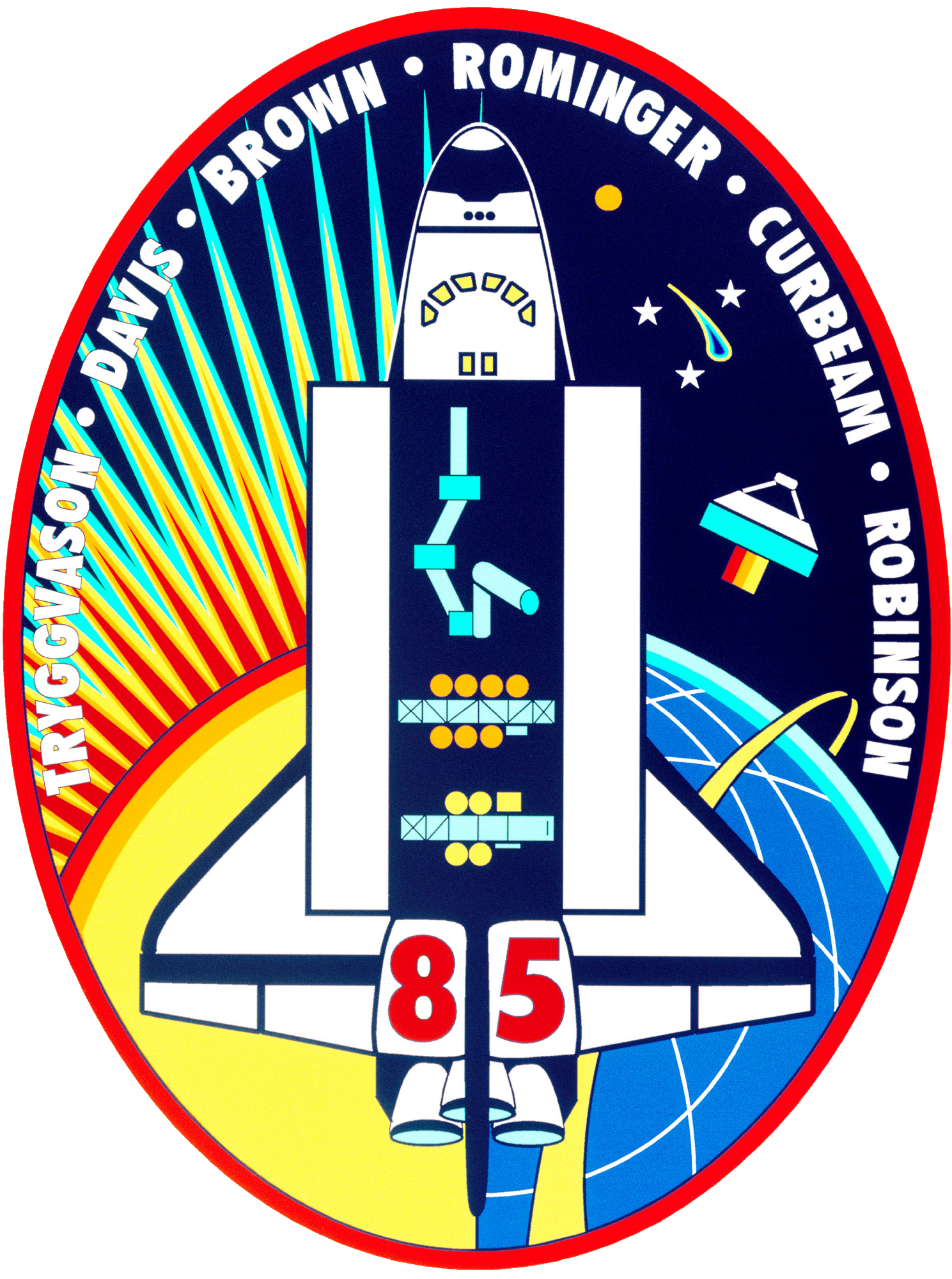
- Mission insignia
- Retired: June 30, 2012
- Scientific career
- Fields: Mechanical engineering
- Thesis: The Kinematics of Turbulent Boundary Layer Structure (1991)

Stephen Kern Robinson (born October 26, 1955) is an American former NASA astronaut.

== Education ==
He was active in the Boy Scouts of America, where he achieved its second-highest rank, Life Scout. Robinson graduated from Campolindo High School, Moraga, California, in 1973, and obtained a Bachelor of Science degree in mechanical and aeronautical engineering from the University of California, Davis, in 1978, a Master of Science degree in Mechanical Engineering from Stanford University in 1985; and a doctorate in mechanical engineering, with a minor in aeronautics and astronautics from Stanford University in 1990.

== Organizations ==
Robinson is a member of the American Institute of Aeronautics and Astronautics, the Aerospace Medical Association, and the Experimental Aircraft Association.

== Awards and honors ==
He was awarded the NASA Ames Honor Award for Scientists in 1989, the American Institute of Aeronautics and Astronautics Outstanding Technical paper Award for Applied Aerodynamics in 1992, and the NASA/Space Club G. M. Low Memorial Engineering Fellowship in 1993.

== Career ==
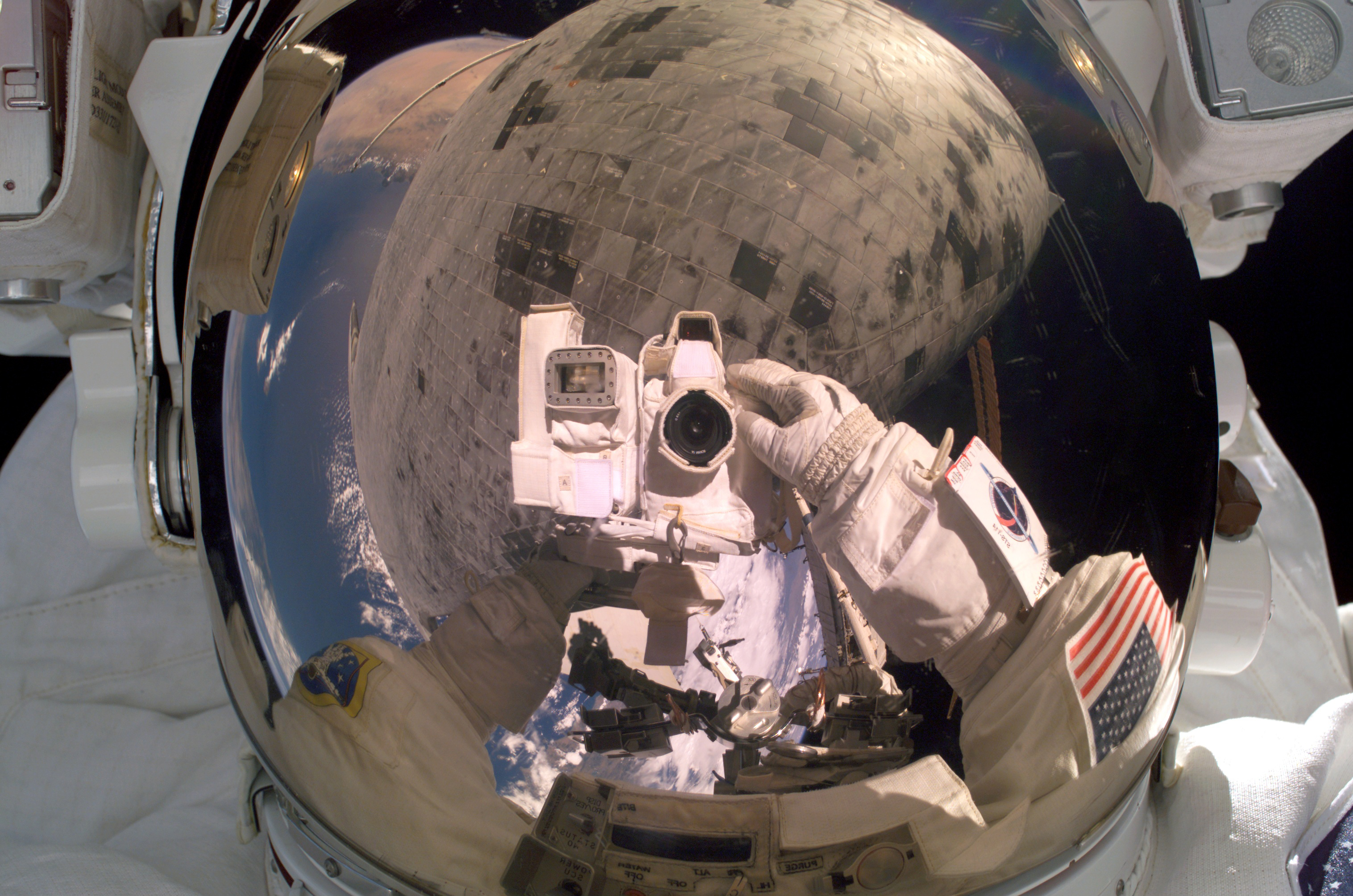
Robinson turns the camera on himself during his historic repair job "underneath" Discovery on August 3, 2005. The Shuttle's heat shield, where Robinson removed a pair of protruding gap fillers, is reflected in his visor

Robinson started work for NASA in 1975 as a student intern at NASA's Ames Research Center in Mountain View, California. After graduation from Davis, he joined NASA Ames in 1979 as a research scientist in the fields of fluid dynamics, aerodynamics, experimental instrumentation, and computational scientific visualization. While at Ames, Robinson earned masters and doctorate degrees in mechanical engineering at Stanford University, with research emphasis in turbulence physics, and additional research in human eye dynamics. In 1990, Robinson was selected as Chief of the Experimental Flow Physics Branch at NASA's Langley Research Center in Hampton, Virginia, where he led a group of 35 engineers and scientists engaged in aerodynamics and fluid physics research.

In 1993, Robinson was awarded the NASA/Space Club Low Memorial Engineering Fellowship, and was assigned for 15 months to the Massachusetts Institute of Technology (MIT) as Visiting Engineer in the Man Vehicle Laboratory (MVL). As an MVL team-member, he conducted neurovestibular research on astronauts on the Spacelab Life Sciences 2 Shuttle mission (STS-58). Other MIT research included EVA dynamics for satellite capture and space construction. While in Cambridge, Massachusetts, Robinson was also a visiting scientist at the U.S. Department of Transportation's Volpe National Transportation Systems Center, doing research on environmental modeling for flight simulation, cockpit human factors for GPS-guided instrument approach procedures, and moving-map displays.

Robinson returned to NASA Langley in September 1994, where he accepted a dual assignment as research scientist in the Multidisciplinary design optimization Branch, and as leader of the Aerodynamics and Acoustics element of NASA's General Aviation Technology program.

Robinson has logged over 1,400 hours in aircraft ranging from antique taildraggers to NASA jets.

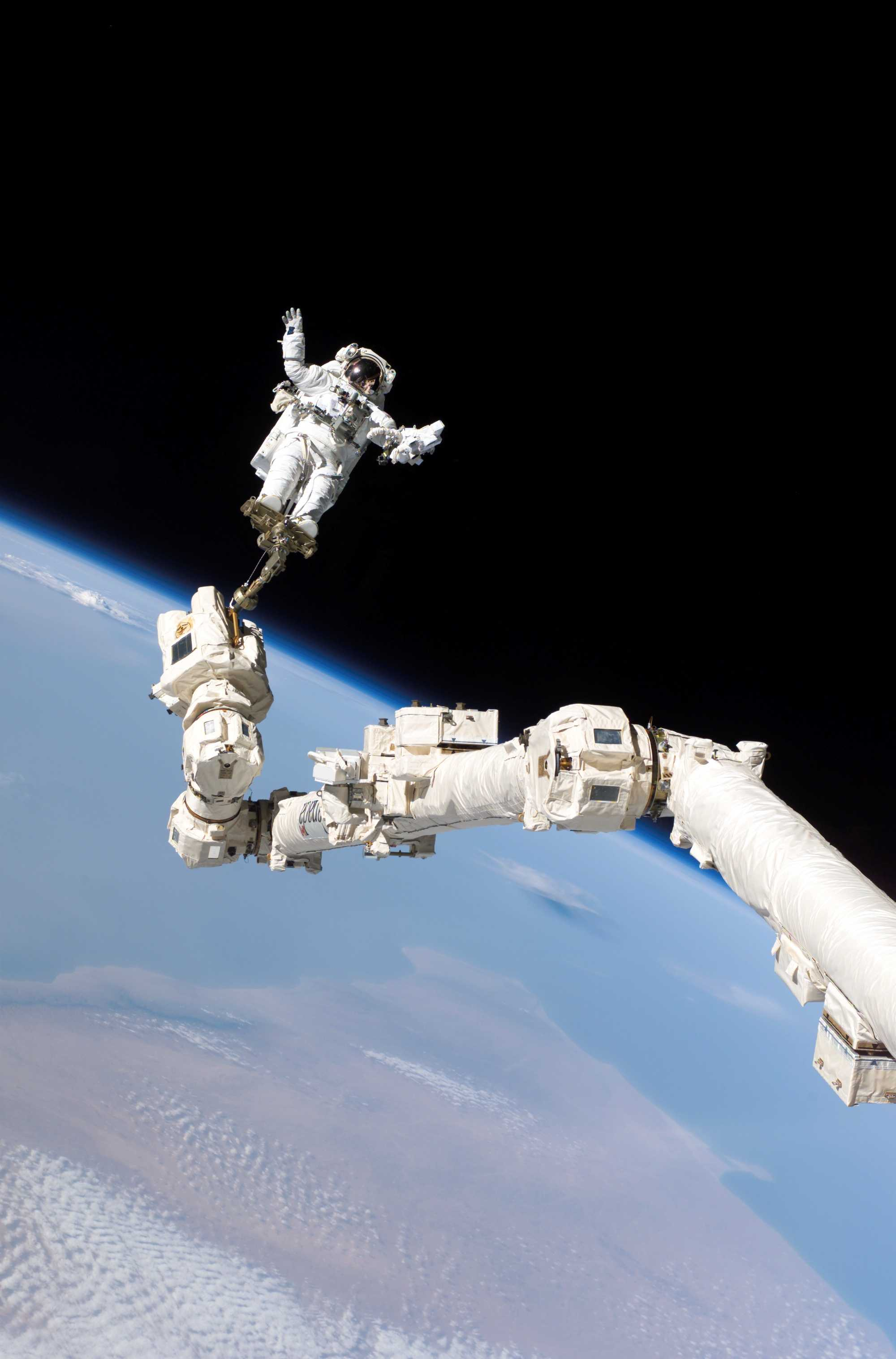
Steve Robinson on an EVA with Canadarm2 on the International Space Station

Robinson began applying to become an astronaut in 1983, and was selected to join NASA Astronaut Corps in 1995. He has flown on four Space Shuttle missions: STS-85, STS-95, STS-114 and STS-130. Robinson served as backup flight engineer for the International Space Station Expedition 4.

On August 3, 2005, as a Mission Specialist (and Flight Engineer) on STS-114, the first Return to Flight mission following the Space Shuttle Columbia disaster, Robinson became the first human to perform an in-flight repair to the Shuttle's exterior. Robinson was sent to remove two protruding gap fillers on Discovery's heat shield, after engineers determined they might pose a danger upon re-entry. Robinson successfully removed the loose material while the Discovery was docked to the International Space Station. Robinson performed another "first" on STS-114 when he made the first podcast from space (transcript & audio) on August 7, 2005. His self-portrait took during the repair was considered one of the early space selfies.

Robinson served as a mission specialist and flight engineer on STS-130, which launched on February 8, 2010, and rendezvoused with the International Space Station on February 10. As Intravehicular Officer, he choreographed the three EVAs involved with the installation and activation of the Node 3 module and Cupola.

Robinson also served as CAPCOM for various Space Shuttle missions.

He retired from the Astronaut Corps in July 2012 to take a teaching position as a full-time professor in the Mechanical and Aerospace Engineering department at University of California, Davis. Robinson currently directs the UC Davis Center for Human/Robotics/Vehicle Integration and Performance (HRVIP).

== Personal life ==
He enjoys flying, antique aircraft, swimming, canoeing, hiking, music, art, and stereo photography. He plays lead guitar in Max Q, a rock and roll band. His Canadian parents, William, a land surveyor, and Joyce Robinson, resided in Moraga, California.
