= STS-95 =

1998 American crewed spaceflight

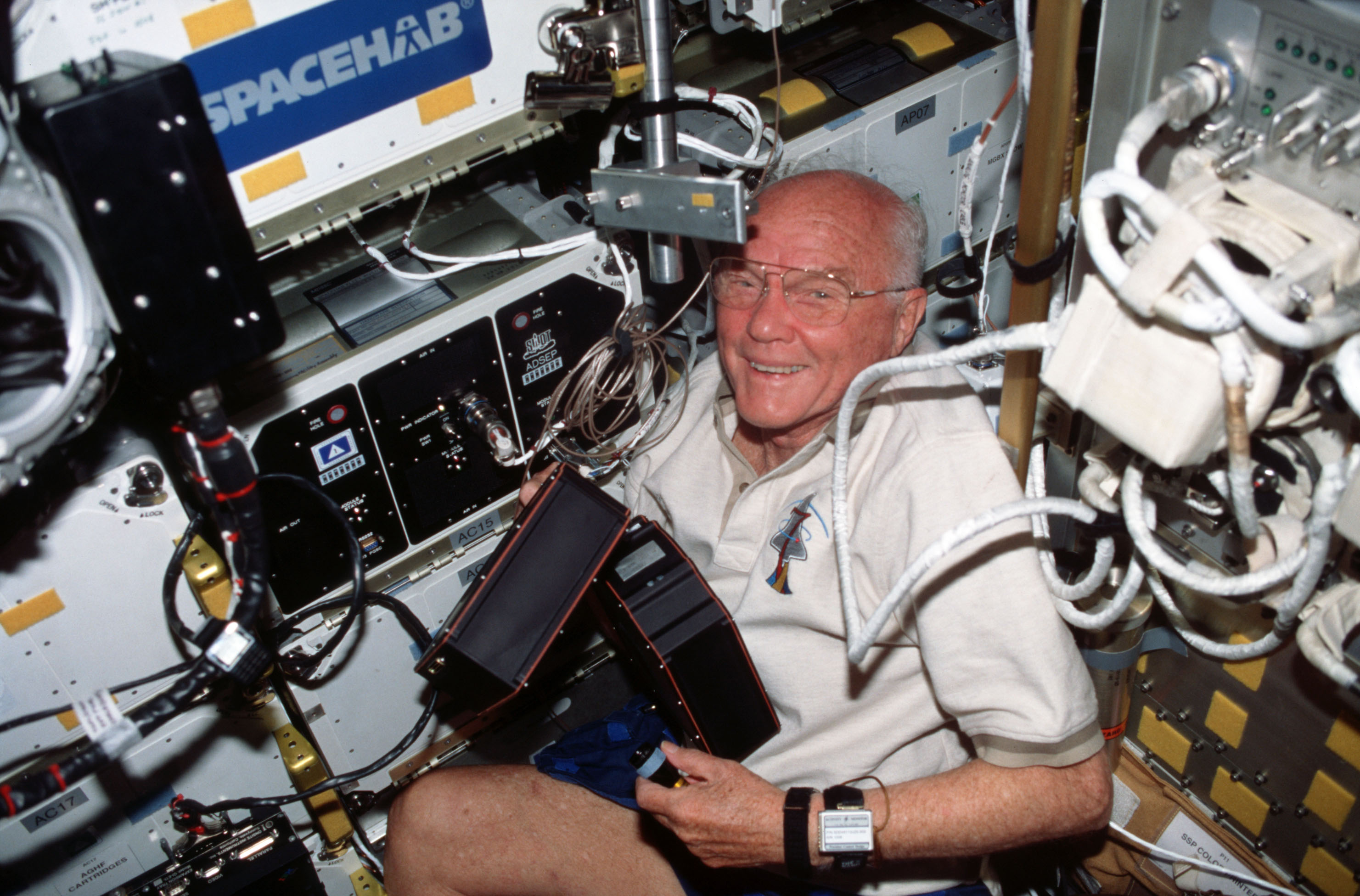
- John Glenn in the Spacehab Single Module during flight
- Names: Space Transportation System-95
- Mission type: Bioscience research Astronomy
- Operator: NASA
- COSPAR ID: 1998-064A
- SATCAT no.: 25519
- Mission duration: 8 days, 21 hours, 43 minutes, 56 seconds
- Distance travelled: 5,800,000 kilometres (3,600,000 mi)

Spacecraft properties
- Spacecraft: Space Shuttle Discovery
- Landing mass: 103,321 kilograms (227,784 lb)
- Payload mass: 11,130 kilograms (24,540 lb) {Spacehab)

Crew
- Crew size: 7
- Members: Curtis L. Brown Jr.; Steven W. Lindsey; Pedro Duque; Scott E. Parazynski; Stephen K. Robinson; Chiaki Mukai; John H. Glenn Jr.

Start of mission
- Launch date: 29 October 1998, 19:19:34 UTC
- Launch site: Kennedy, LC-39B

End of mission
- Landing date: 7 November 1998, 17:04 UTC
- Landing site: Kennedy, SLF Runway 33

Orbital parameters
- Reference system: Geocentric
- Regime: Low Earth
- Perigee altitude: 550 kilometres (340 mi)
- Apogee altitude: 561 kilometres (349 mi)
- Inclination: 28.45 degrees
- Period: 96 min
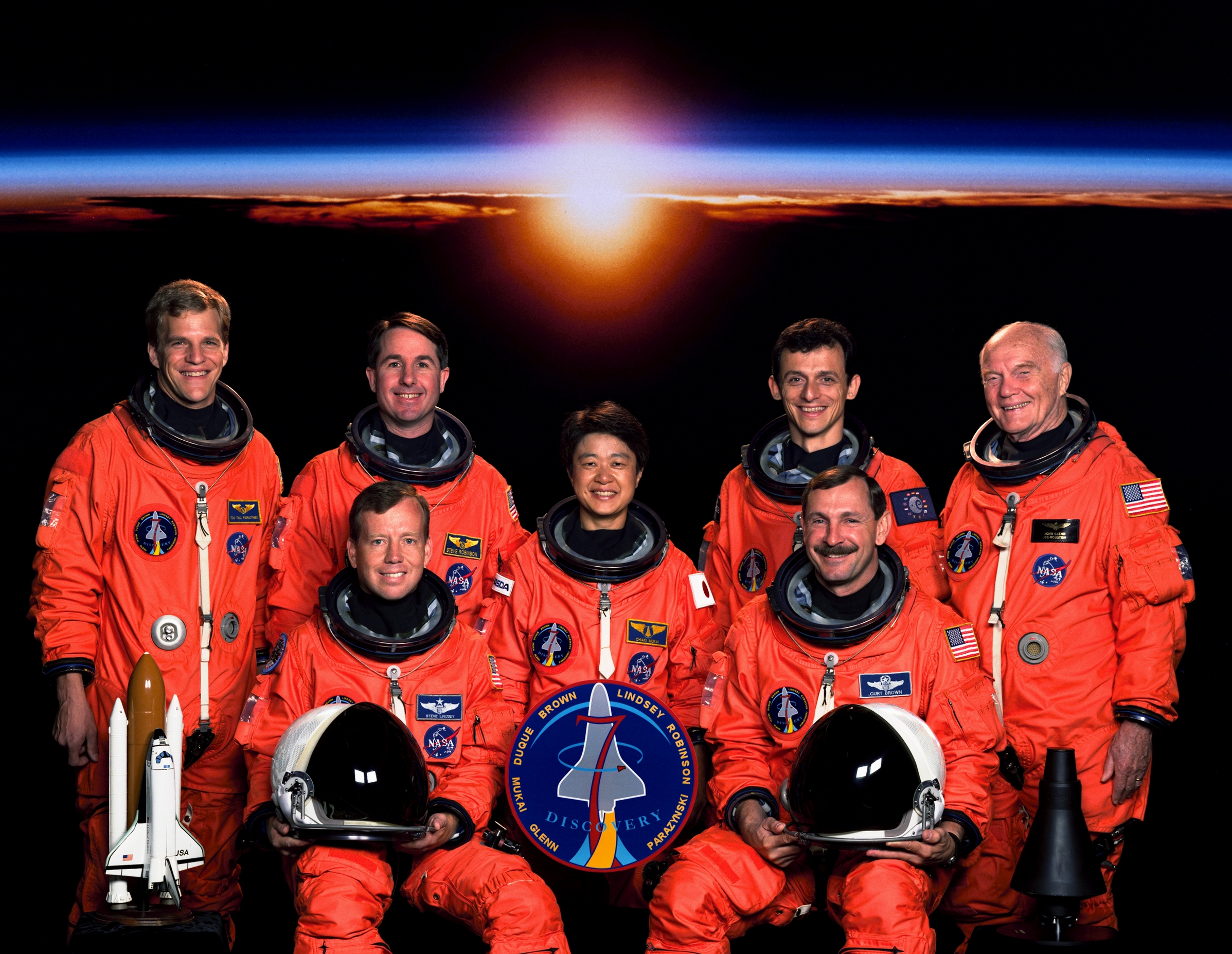
- Top: Parazynski, Robinson, Mukai, Duque, Glenn; Bottom: Lindsey, Brown Space Shuttle program

STS-95 was a Space Shuttle mission launched from Kennedy Space Center, Florida on 29 October 1998, using the orbiter Discovery. It was the 25th flight of Discovery and the 92nd mission flown since the start of the Space Shuttle program in April 1981. It was a highly publicized mission due to former Project Mercury astronaut and United States Senator John H. Glenn Jr.'s return to space for his second space flight. At age 77, Glenn became the oldest person to go into space, a record that remained unbroken for 23 years until 82-year-old Wally Funk flew on a suborbital flight on Blue Origin NS-16, launching on 20 July 2021, which in turn was broken by William Shatner at age 90 on 13 October 2021 and then by Ed Dwight on 19 May 2024. Glenn, however, remains the oldest person to reach Earth orbit. This mission is also noted for inaugurating ATSC HDTV broadcasting in the U.S., with live coast-to-coast coverage of the launch. In another first, Pedro Duque became the first Spaniard in space.

The mission's objectives involved investigating life-sciences experiments, using the SpaceHab module to perform these experiments on Senator Glenn. Scientific objectives on this mission were not limited to furthering an understanding of the human body, but also to increase astronomical understanding with regard to the Sun, and how it affects life on Earth. The Spartan 201 spacecraft was released by the crew, flying free from the Shuttle, studying the acceleration of the solar wind that originates in the Sun's solar corona. The mission lasted just under ten days, with Discovery completing its voyage by landing at the Kennedy Space Center's Shuttle Landing Facility.

The launch was rare in that the official launch weather forecast provided by the 45th Weather Squadron was 100 percent for favorable weather for launch as well as the Shuttle Landing Facility.

Bill Clinton became the second sitting U.S. president to witness a crewed space launch, joined by his wife Hillary on the roof of the Launch Control Center, and the only one to witness a Space Shuttle launch (President Richard Nixon witnessed the launch of Apollo 12).

== Crew ==
Position	Astronaut
Commander	(United States) Curtis L. Brown Jr. Fifth spaceflight
Pilot	(United States) Steven W. Lindsey; Second spaceflight
Mission Specialist 1	(United States) Stephen K. Robinson; Second spaceflight
Mission Specialist 2 Flight Engineer	(United States) Scott E. Parazynski; Third spaceflight
Mission Specialist 3	(Spain) Pedro Duque, ESA; First spaceflight
Payload Specialist 1	(Japan) Chiaki Mukai, NASDA; Second and last spaceflight
Payload Specialist 2	(United States) John H. Glenn Jr. (U.S. Senator D-OH); Second and last spaceflight
This was the final Space Shuttle mission with an astronaut from the pre-shuttle era (Glenn).

=== Crew seat assignments ===
Seat	Launch	Landing	Seats 1–4 are on the flight deck. Seats 5–7 are on the mid-deck.
1	Brown		Seats 1–4 are on the flight deck. Seats 5–7 are on the mid-deck.
2	Lindsey		Seats 1–4 are on the flight deck. Seats 5–7 are on the mid-deck.
3	Duque	Robinson	Seats 1–4 are on the flight deck. Seats 5–7 are on the mid-deck.
4	Parazynski		Seats 1–4 are on the flight deck. Seats 5–7 are on the mid-deck.
5	Robinson	Duque	Seats 1–4 are on the flight deck. Seats 5–7 are on the mid-deck.
6	Glenn		Seats 1–4 are on the flight deck. Seats 5–7 are on the mid-deck.
7	Mukai		Seats 1–4 are on the flight deck. Seats 5–7 are on the mid-deck.

== Mission highlights ==
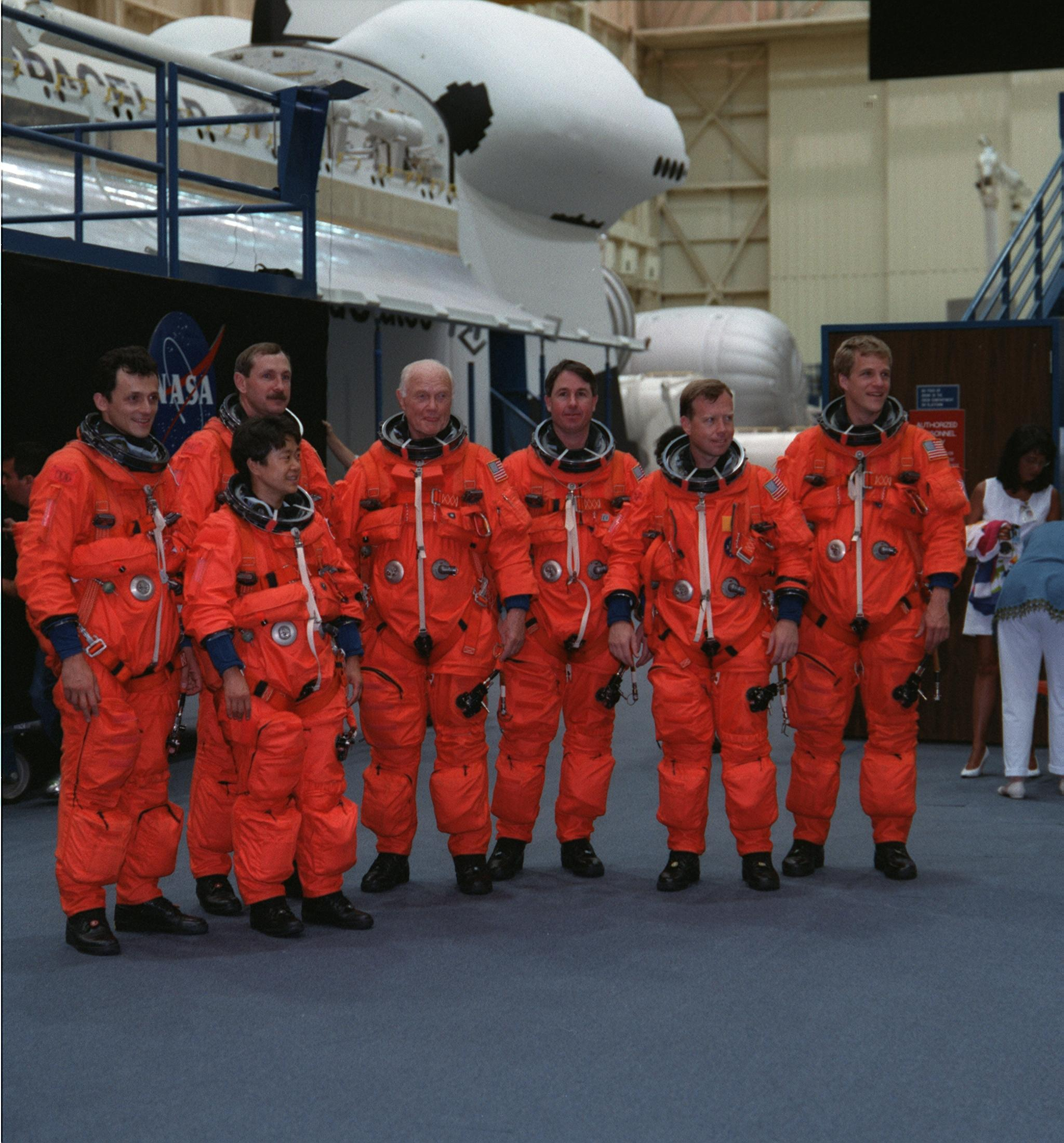
The seven crew members pose for photographers prior to participating in a training session

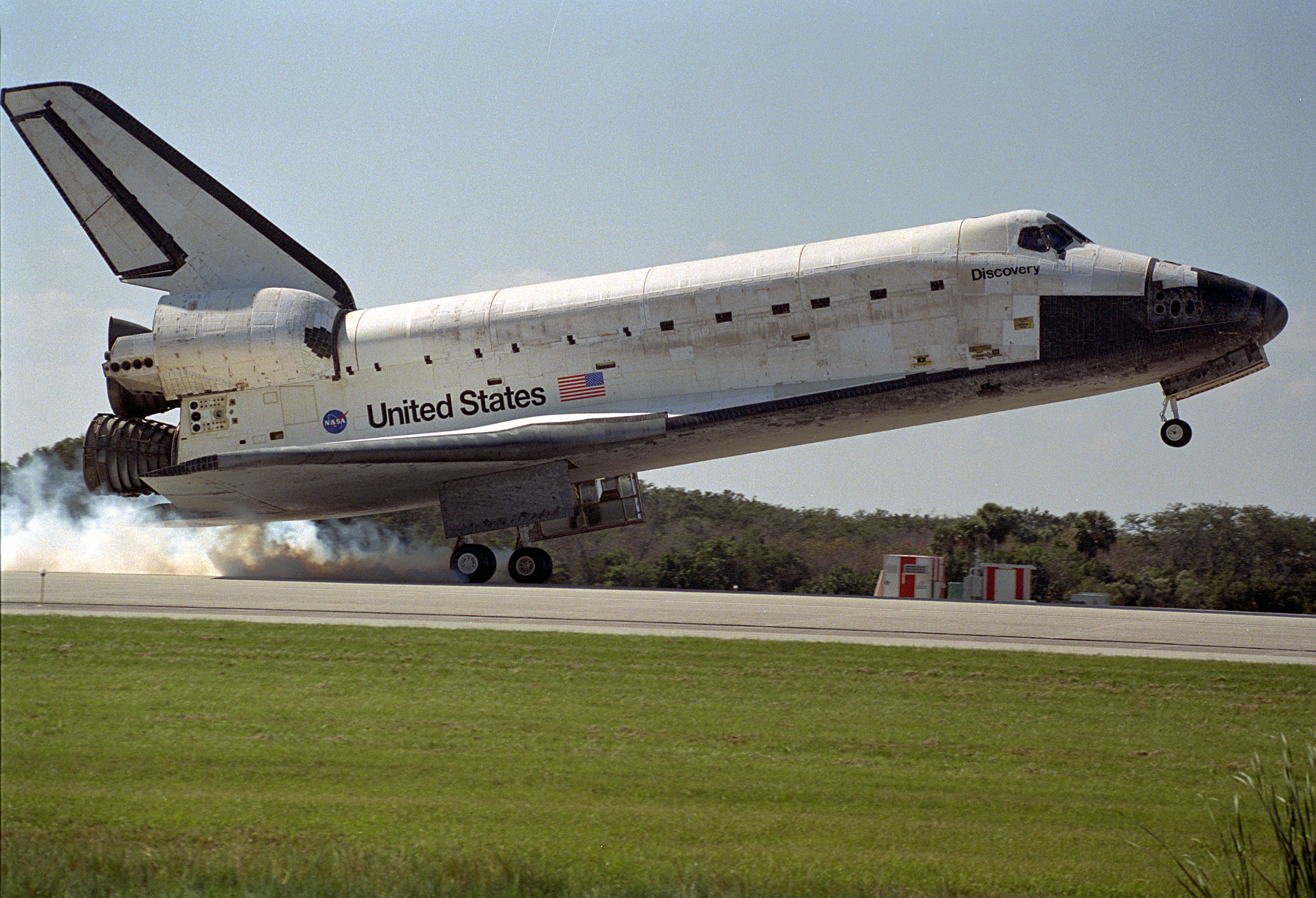
STS-95 lands at the Shuttle Landing Facility, 7 November 1998

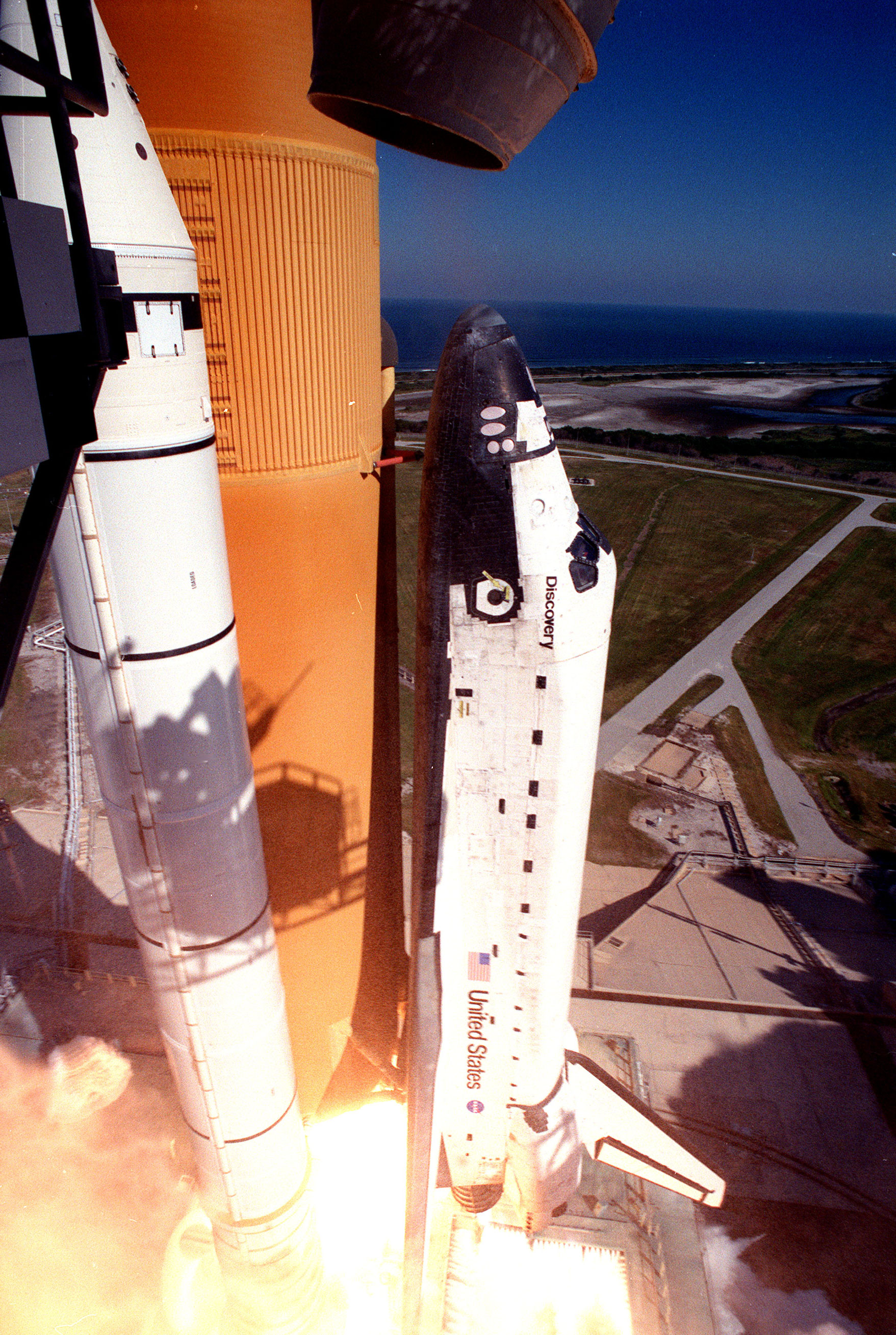
Launch of STS-95

The primary objectives included conducting a variety of science experiments in the pressurized Spacehab module, the deployment and retrieval of the Spartan free-flyer payload, and operations with the HST Orbital Systems Test (HOST) and the International Extreme Ultraviolet Hitchhiker (IEH) payloads carried in the payload bay.

=== Spacehab ===
The Spacehab module flown on STS-95 was provided by Spacehab, Inc., a private company. The Spacehab system provided additional pressurized workspace for experiments, cargo and crew activities. Spacehab modules supported various Shuttle science missions along with several of the joint Shuttle-Mir missions.

For STS-95, a single-module Spacehab flew in the forward portion of Discovery's payload bay, with the crew gaining access to the module through the airlock tunnel system. A variety of experiments sponsored by NASA, the Japanese Space Agency (NASDA) and the European Space Agency (ESA) focused on life sciences, microgravity sciences and advanced technology during the flight.

=== Spartan ===
The Spartan 201-5 free-flyer was deployed and retrieved using the Shuttle's mechanical arm. It was designed to investigate physical conditions and processes of the hot outer layers of the Sun's atmosphere, or solar corona. While deployed from the Shuttle, Spartan gathered measurements of the solar corona and solar wind. NASA expected that information collected during this mission would lead to a much better understanding of the solar wind that directly influences orbiting satellites and weather conditions on Earth which in turn impact television and phone communications. This was the fifth flight for the Spartan payload; it originally flew on the STS-56 mission in April 1993. On its previous mission, STS-87 in November 1997, Spartan developed problems shortly after being deployed from the Shuttle and had to be brought back into the Shuttle's payload bay by spacewalk. These problems were due with the attitude control system for fine pointing toward solar targets, and Spartan was cleared for use again on STS-95. Its mission was to successfully perform the same experiments from the previous year.

=== HOST ===
The Hubble Space Telescope Orbital Systems Test (HOST) platform carried experiments to validate components planned for installation during the third Hubble Space Telescope servicing mission and to evaluate new technologies in an earth orbiting environment. There were four experiments on the HOST platform. The NICMOS Cooling System allowed for zero-g verification of a reverse turbo Brayton cycle cryocooler, which allowed for longer life operation than the dewar system used on Hubble at the time. The HST 486 computer allowed for the identification of any radiation-susceptible parts in the DF-224 replacement computer to be carried on the third servicing mission, and demonstrate hardware and software responses to Single Event Upsets (SEUs). A solid state recorder compared on-orbit operation of the flight-spare solid state recorder with the unit installed in Hubble. A fiber optic line test used the same 4 kbit/s data stream that was sent to the orbiter's Payload Data Interrogator (PDI) and routed to a laptop computer for post-flight comparison.

=== IEH ===
The International Extreme Ultraviolet Hitchhiker (IEH) payload involved a half dozen different experiments mounted on a support structure which was carried in Discovery's payload bay. The six experiments that made up the IEH payload were the Solar Extreme Ultraviolet Hitchhiker (SEH) payload, which obtained EUV and FUV fluxes that are required when studying the Earth's upper atmosphere; an Ultraviolet Spectrograph Telescope for Astronomical Research (UVSTAR) payload designed to measure EUV fluxes which could be used to form images of extended plasma sources (ex. Jupiter, hot stars, etc.); the STAR-LITE payload which made observations of extended and diffused astrophysical targets; the CONCAP-IV payload designed to grow thin films via physical vapor transport; the Petite Amateur Navy Satellite (PANSAT) payload which was managed by the Department of Defense Space Test Program, and involved a small deployable satellite that stored and transmitted digital communications to PANSAT ground stations; and a Getaway Special (GAS) payload.

=== Medical experiments on Glenn ===
According to the New York Times, Glenn "won his seat on the shuttle flight by lobbying NASA for two years to fly as a human guinea pig for geriatric studies", which were named as the main reasons for his participation in the STS-95 mission. This series of experiments conducted on Glenn during the mission was sponsored by NASA and the National Institute on Aging, and based on the fact that the aging process and a space flight experience share a number of similar physiological responses. The investigations were expected to gather information which may provide a model system to help scientists interested in understanding aging. Some of these similarities include bone and muscle loss, balance disorders and sleep disturbances. Shortly before the flight, researchers learned that Glenn had to be disqualified from another of the flight's two main priority human experiments (about the effects of melatonin) because he did not meet one of study's medical conditions; he still participated in two other experiments about sleep monitoring and protein use. Data provided from Glenn during this mission was compared to data obtained from Glenn's Friendship 7 orbital mission in 1962.

=== Trivia ===
Glenn was the oldest person, and the third sitting member of Congress, to fly into space. He was preceded by U.S. Senator from Utah Jake Garn (STS-51-D) and U.S. Representative (later Senator) from Florida Bill Nelson (STS-61-C). At the time, Glenn was Ohio's senior or ranking Senator. Other astronauts who later entered politics include Harrison Schmitt (Apollo 17), later U.S. Senator from New Mexico, Jack Swigert (Apollo 13), who was elected to Congress in the state of Colorado but died before being sworn in, and U.S. Senator from Arizona Mark Kelly (STS-108, STS-121, STS-124, and STS-134).

In a reprise of his first space flight, while in orbit, Glenn was greeted again by the citizens of Perth and Rockingham in Australia. They left their private and municipal lights on while the Discovery passed overhead, just like they did during his Friendship 7 flight.

This is the first mission with the NASA "meatball" insignia (above) displayed on a Space Shuttle orbiter, replacing the "worm" logotype (below).

This is the first mission wherein a Space Shuttle orbiter (Discovery in this mission) uses NASA's meatball insignia on its markings. It replaced the worm logotype that all orbiters had. Endeavour, Atlantis, and Columbia would follow in their respective missions of STS-88, STS-101, and STS-109. Space Shuttle orbiters Enterprise and Challenger didn't have this change, for Enterprise became the property of The Smithsonian in 1985 and Challenger was destroyed in 1986.

== Crew award ==
The crew of STS-95 was awarded the Space Foundation's Douglas S. Morrow Public Outreach Award in 1999. The award is given annually to an individual or organization that has made significant contributions to public awareness of space programs.

== Anomalies ==
The drag chute door detached and fell from the orbiter at main engine ignition. There was some concern that the drag chute could deploy prematurely prior to touchdown, and the decision was made not to use the chute during landing rollout. Wheel brakes and speedbrakes were sufficient to bring Discovery to a stop on Runway 33 at the Shuttle Landing Facility.

An RCS leak venting from a thruster on the left-hand OMS pod was observed in orbit. An isolation valve was used to disable the jet. Attitude control was maintained by system redundancy; there were 44 jets located around the orbiter.

== Inaugural HDTV broadcast ==
The Advanced Television Systems Committee (ATSC) provided live coverage of the lift-off as the public launch of the high-definition television system in the United States. The signal was transmitted coast-to-coast, and was seen by the public in science centers, and other public theaters specially equipped to receive and display the broadcast. The Harris Corporation provided the equipment necessary for transmitting and receiving the broadcast. The coverage was hosted by former CBS News anchor Walter Cronkite, and former Gemini/Apollo-era astronaut Pete Conrad.

== Wake-up calls ==
NASA had begun a tradition of playing music to astronauts during the Gemini program, which was first used to wake up a flight crew during Apollo 15. Each track is specially chosen and often has a particular meaning to an individual member of the crew, or it is somehow applicable to their situation.

Flight Day	Song	Artist	Played for
Day 2	"What a Wonderful World"	Louis Armstrong	Scott Parazynski
Day 3	"Cachito"	Nat King Cole	Pedro Duque
Day 4	"This Pretty Planet"	Tom Chapin	Steven Lindsey
Day 4	"Halelujahs"	Chris Rice	Steven Lindsey
Day 5	"Moon River"	Andy Williams	John Glenn
Day 6	"The House Is Rockin'"	Stevie Ray Vaughan	Steve Robinson
Day 7	"Wakaki Chi" ("Young Spirit")	Keio University "cheering song"	Chiaki Mukai
Day 8	"I Know You're Out There Somewhere"	The Moody Blues	Curtis Brown
Day 9	"Voyage into Space"	Peter Nero	John Glenn
Day 10	"La Cucaracha"		Pedro Duque

== Mission insignia ==
The STS-95 mission insignia was designed by the crew, and evokes the scientific, engineering and historic elements of the flight. It depicts a stylized blue Space Shuttle with yellow, red, and blue streamers coming from its stern that represent the global benefits of the mission's science experiments and the solar science objectives of the Spartan satellite. A small Mercury space capsule is depicted orbiting the Shuttle, and the red streamer extends up towards the center of the Shuttle to form a "7". The capsule and the number seven are in reference to Glenn's historic association with the Mercury Seven astronauts and their spacecraft: all of the crewed Mercury spacecraft had "7" as part of their name. The mission payloads—microgravity material science, medical research for humans on Earth and in space, and astronomy—represent three major scientific fields and are symbolized in the insignia by rocket plumes.

== See also ==
- John H. Glenn Jr.
- List of human spaceflights
- List of Space Shuttle missions
- Mercury-Atlas 6
- Outline of space science
