= STS-66 =

1994 American crewed spaceflight

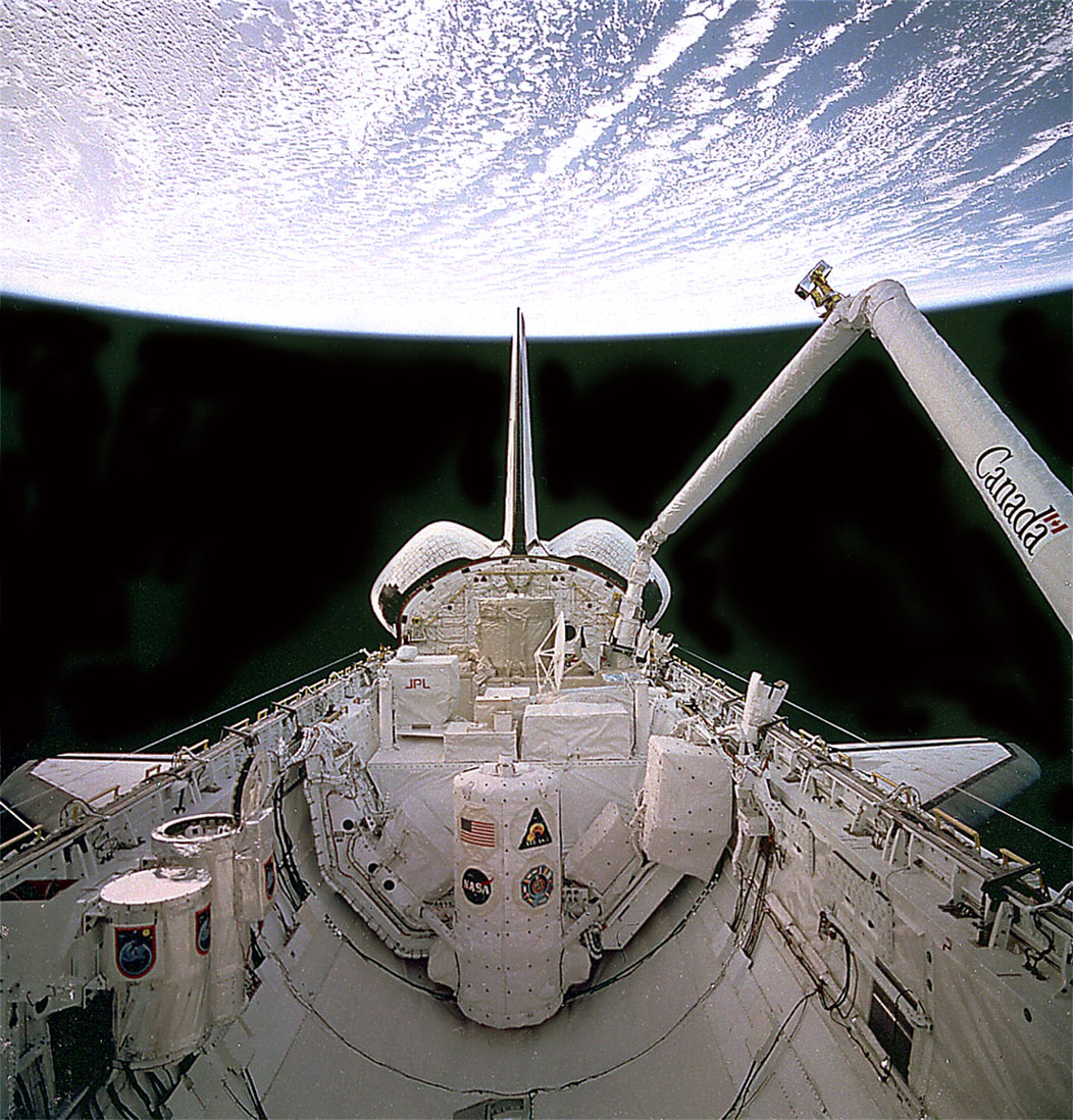
- ATLAS-3 in the payload bay of Atlantis, while the Shuttle's Canadarm grapples CRISTA-SPAS
- Names: Space Transportation System-66
- Mission type: Research
- Operator: NASA
- COSPAR ID: 1994-073A
- SATCAT no.: 23340
- Mission duration: 10 days, 22 hours, 34 minutes, 2 seconds
- Distance travelled: 7,330,226 kilometers (4,554,791 mi)
- Orbits completed: 174

Spacecraft properties
- Spacecraft: Space Shuttle Atlantis
- Payload mass: 10,544 kilograms (23,246 lb)

Crew
- Crew size: 6
- Members: Donald R. McMonagle; Curtis L. Brown, Jr.; Ellen Ochoa; Joseph R. Tanner; Jean-François Clervoy; Scott E. Parazynski

Start of mission
- Launch date: November 3, 1994, 16:59:43.060 UTC
- Launch site: Kennedy, LC-39B

End of mission
- Landing date: November 14, 1994, 15:33:45 UTC
- Landing site: Edwards, Runway 22

Orbital parameters
- Reference system: Geocentric
- Regime: Low Earth
- Perigee altitude: 296 kilometres (184 mi)
- Apogee altitude: 310 kilometres (190 mi)
- Inclination: 57.0 degrees
- Period: 90.6 minutes
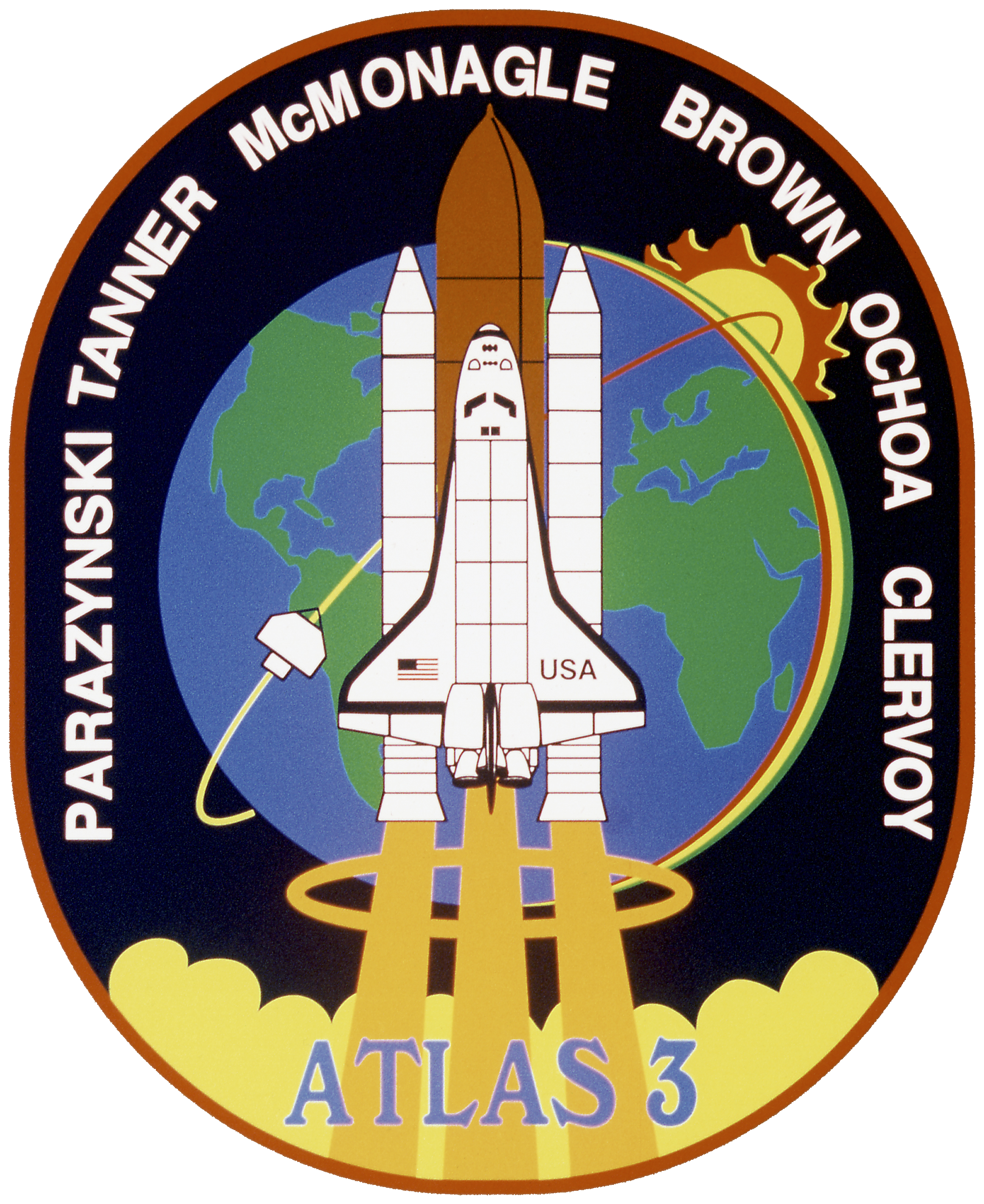
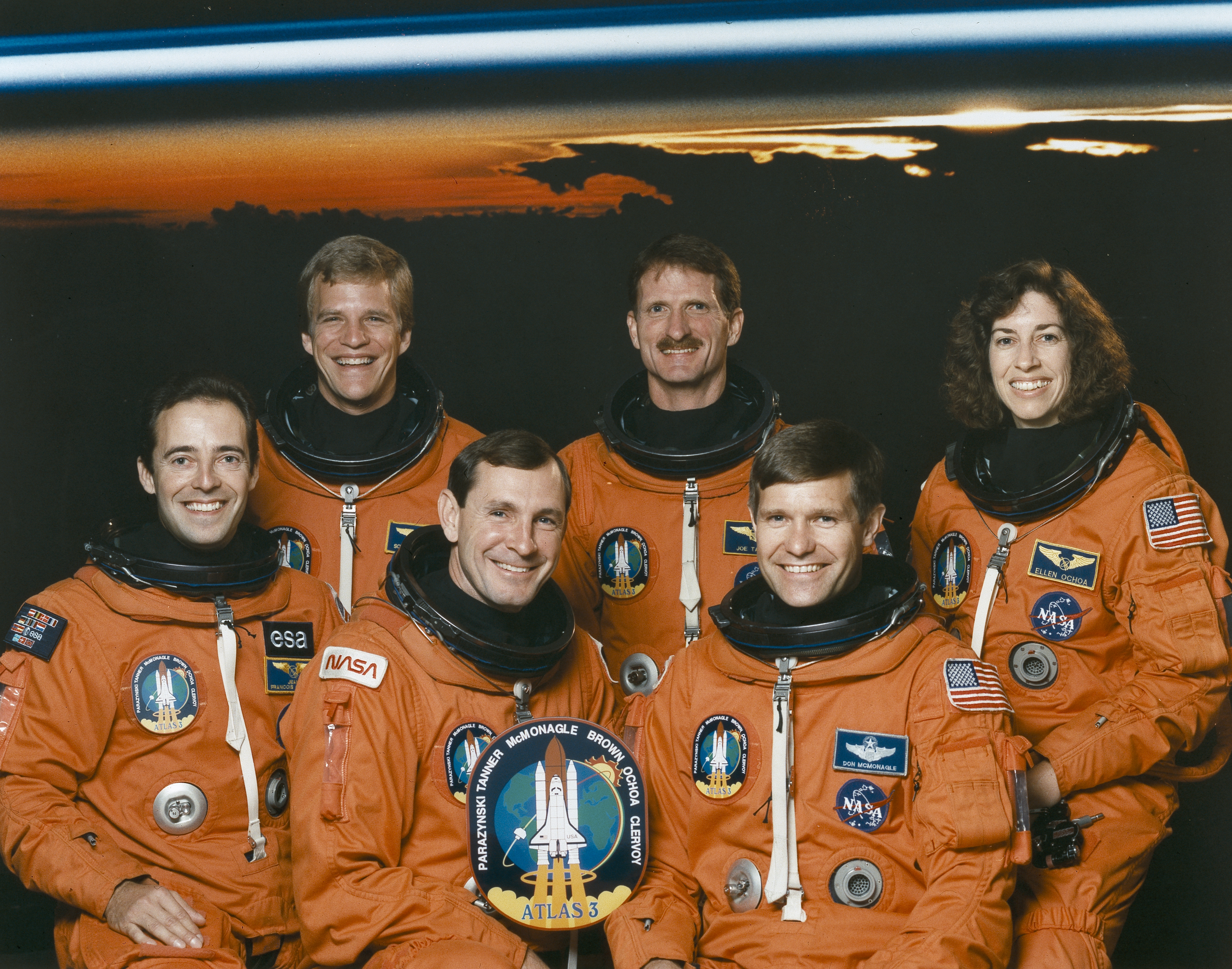
- STS-66 mission patch Left to right: Clervoy, Parazynski, Brown, Tanner, McMonagle, Ochoa Space Shuttle program

STS-66 was a Space Shuttle program mission that was flown by the Space Shuttle Atlantis. STS-66 launched on November 3, 1994, at 11:59:43.060 am EDT from Launch Pad 39B at NASA's Kennedy Space Center. Atlantis landed at Edwards Air Force Base on November 14, 1994, at 10:33:45 am EST.

== Crew ==
Position	Astronaut
Commander	(United States) Donald R. McMonagle; Third and last spaceflight
Pilot	(United States) Curtis L. Brown, Jr. Second spaceflight
Mission Specialist 1	(United States) Ellen Ochoa; Second spaceflight
Mission Specialist 2 Flight Engineer	(United States) Joseph R. Tanner; First spaceflight
Mission Specialist 3	(France) Jean-François Clervoy, CNES; First spaceflight
Mission Specialist 4	(United States) Scott E. Parazynski; First spaceflight

=== Crew seat assignments ===
Seat	Launch	Landing	Seats 1–4 are on the flight deck. Seats 5–7 are on the mid-deck.
1	McMonagle		Seats 1–4 are on the flight deck. Seats 5–7 are on the mid-deck.
2	Brown		Seats 1–4 are on the flight deck. Seats 5–7 are on the mid-deck.
3	Parazynski	Clervoy	Seats 1–4 are on the flight deck. Seats 5–7 are on the mid-deck.
4	Tanner		Seats 1–4 are on the flight deck. Seats 5–7 are on the mid-deck.
5	Clervoy	Parazynski	Seats 1–4 are on the flight deck. Seats 5–7 are on the mid-deck.
6	Ochoa		Seats 1–4 are on the flight deck. Seats 5–7 are on the mid-deck.
7	Unused		Seats 1–4 are on the flight deck. Seats 5–7 are on the mid-deck.

== Mission highlights ==
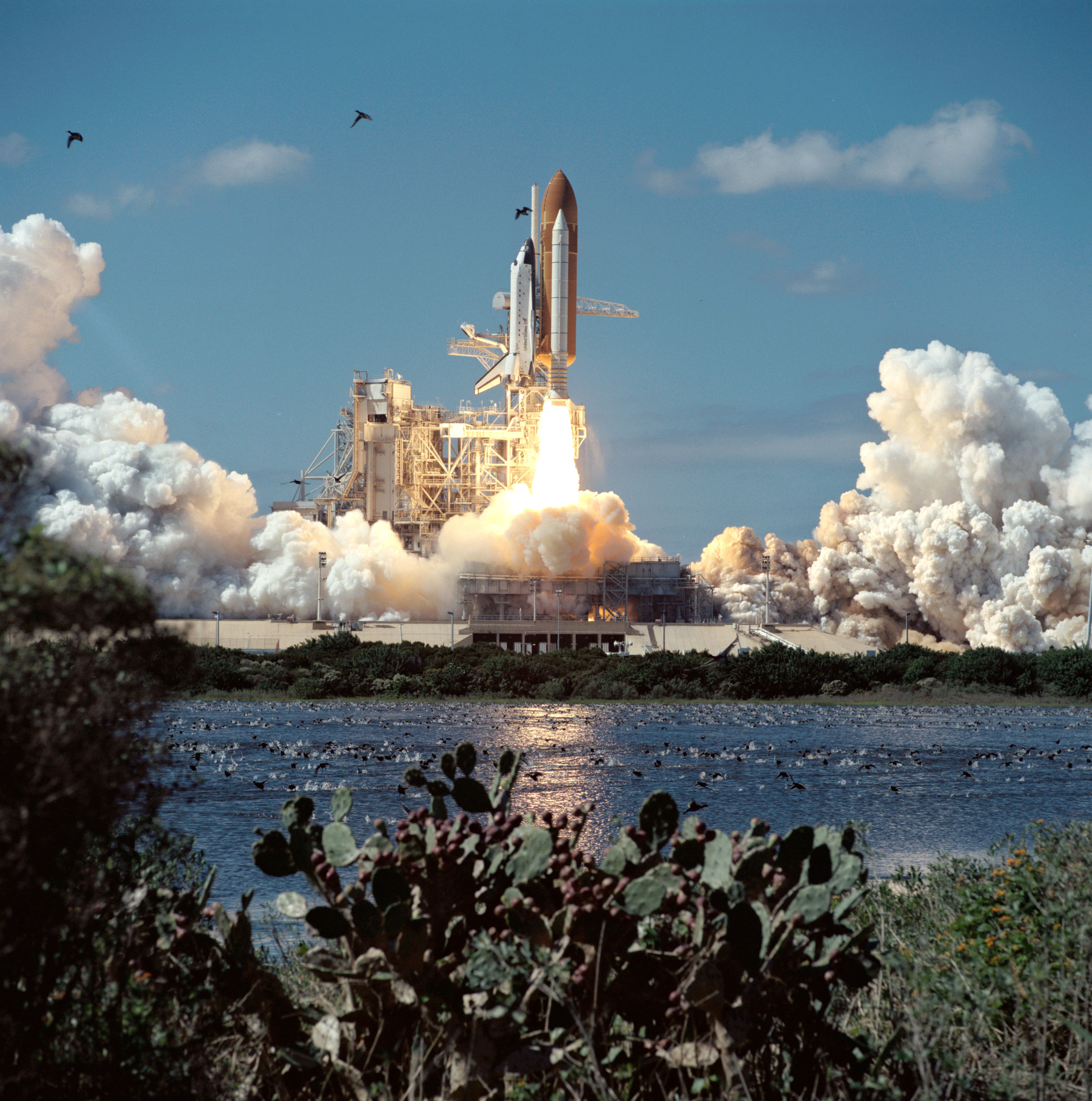
Launch of Space Shuttle Atlantis and the beginning of STS-66 mission.

The Atmospheric Laboratory for Applications and Sciences – 3 (ATLAS-03) was the primary payload aboard STS-66. It continued the series of Spacelab flights to study the energy of the sun and how it affects the Earth's climate and environment. The ATLAS-03 mission made the first detailed measurements from the Shuttle of the Northern Hemisphere's middle atmosphere in late fall. The timing of the flight, when the Antarctic ozone hole was diminishing, allowed scientists to study possible effects of the ozone hole on mid-latitudes, the way Antarctic air recovers, and how the northern atmosphere changes as the winter season approaches.

In addition to the ATLAS-03 investigations, the mission included deployment and retrieval of the Cryogenic Infrared Spectrometer Telescope for Atmosphere, or CRISTA. Mounted on the Shuttle Pallet Satellite, the payload is designed to explore the variability of the atmosphere and provide measurements that will complement those obtained by the Upper Atmosphere Research Satellite launched aboard Discovery in 1991. CRISTA-SPAS is a joint U.S./German experiment.

Other payloads in Atlantis's cargo bay included the Shuttle Solar Backscatter Ultraviolet (SSBUV-7) payload and the Experiment on the Sun Complementing ATLAS (ESCAPE-II). Payloads located in the middeck include the Physiological & Anatomical Rodent Experiment (PARE/NIR-R), Protein Crystal Growth-Thermal Enclosure (PCG-TES), Protein Crystal Growth- Single Locker (PCG-STES), Space Tissue Loss/National Institute of Health (STL/NIH-C), Space Acceleration Measurement System (SAMS) and the Heat Pipe Performance-2 Experiment (HPP-2).

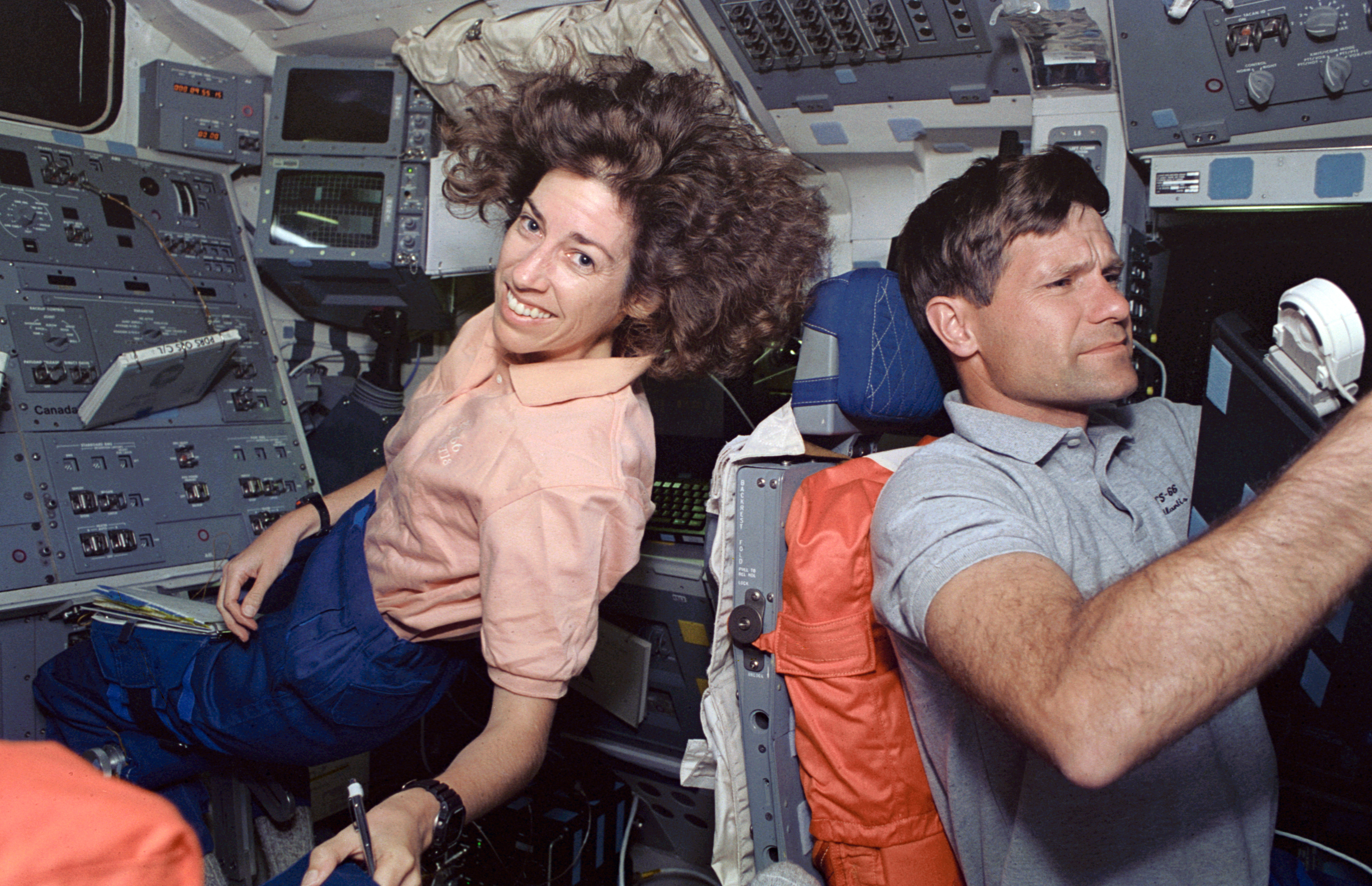
Astronaut Ellen Ochoa at RMS controls on aft flight deck of the Space Shuttle Atlantis

STS-66 further advanced comprehensive effort to collect data about sun's energy output, chemical makeup of the Earth's middle atmosphere, and how these factors affect global ozone levels. Seven instruments on the Atmospheric Laboratory for Applications and Science-3 (ATLAS-3) also flew on first two ATLAS flights. No other collection of space-based instruments provides the same extensive range of atmospheric measurements. Also considered a primary payload was the Cryogenic Infrared Spectrometers and Telescopes for the Atmosphere-Shuttle Pallet Satellite (CRISTA-SPAS), continuing joint NASA-German Space Agency (DARA, now the DLR) series of scientific missions. ATLAS-3 and CRISTA-SPAS considered as joint mission with single set of science objectives. During the mission the crew divided into two teams for around-the-clock research.

ATLAS-3 instruments, mounted on a Spacelab pallet in the cargo bay, included Atmospheric Trace Molecule Spectroscopy (ATMOS), which collected more data on trace gases in the atmosphere than on all three of its previous flights combined; Shuttle Solar Backscatter Ultraviolet Spectrometer (SSBUV), which took ozone measurements to calibrate ozone monitor on aging NOAA-9 satellite as well as cooperative measurements with other ATLAS-3 instruments; Active Cavity Radiometer Irradiance Monitor (ACRIM), which took extremely precise measurements of the sun's total radiation for 30 orbits as calibration reference for sister instrument on Upper Atmosphere Research Satellite (UARS) launched in 1991; Measurement of the Solar Constant (SOLCON), provided by Belgium, which also measured solar radiation but as reference point to track changes over years; Solar Spectrum Measurement (SOLSPEC), French instrument, measured the Sun's radiation as function of wavelength; and Solar Ultraviolet Spectral Irradiance Monitor (SUSIM), which collected its highest precision solar ultraviolet radiation measurements in its 15-year lifetime. Millimeter Wave Atmospheric Sounder (MAS), collected nine hours of observations, measuring distribution of water vapor, chlorine monoxide and ozone at altitudes between 12 and 60 miles (20 to 100 kilometres (62 mi)), before computer malfunction halted instrument operations.

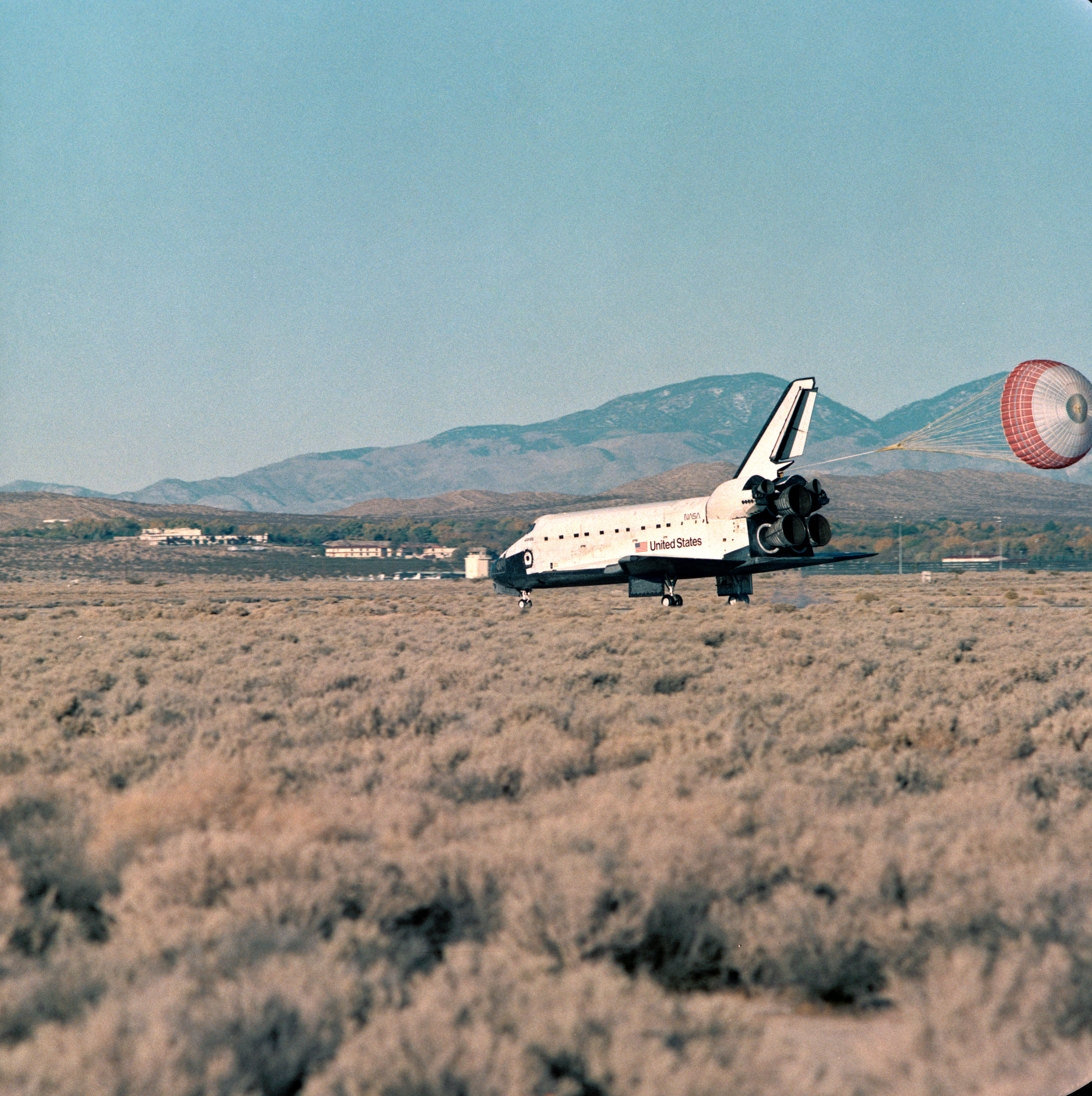
Atlantis lands to conclude the STS-66 mission

CRISTA-SPAS released from orbiter's Remote Manipulator System arm on second day of mission. Flying at distance of about 25 to 44 miles (40 to 70 kilometres (43 mi)) behind the Shuttle, payload collected data for more than eight days before being retrieved and returned to the cargo bay. The CRISTA instrument gathered first global information about medium and small scale disturbances in trace gases in middle atmosphere, which could lead to better models of the atmosphere and Earth's energy balance. The second CRISTA-SPAS instrument, the Middle Atmosphere High Resolution Spectrograph Investigation (MAHRSI) measured amounts of ozone-destroying hydroxyl and nitric oxide in the middle atmosphere and lower thermosphere from 24 to 72 miles (40 to 120 kilometres (75 mi)). MAHRSI yielded first complete global maps of hydroxyl in atmosphere.

For retrieval of CRISTA-SPAS, a different approach method to the spacecraft was successfully tested as a prelude to the upcoming U.S. Shuttle/Russian Space Station Mir docking flights. Called R-Bar approach, it is expected to save propellant while reducing risk of contamination to Mir systems from orbiter thruster jet firings. STS-66 was the last solo shuttle flight for Atlantis for over 14 years, as her upcoming missions were dedicated to Mir, and ISS flights. Atlantis would not fly solo again until STS-125 (The final Hubble Space Telescope Mission).

== See also ==
- List of human spaceflights
- List of Space Shuttle missions
- Outline of space science
- Space Shuttle
