= Scott E. Parazynski =

American astronaut (born 1961)

Scott Parazynski
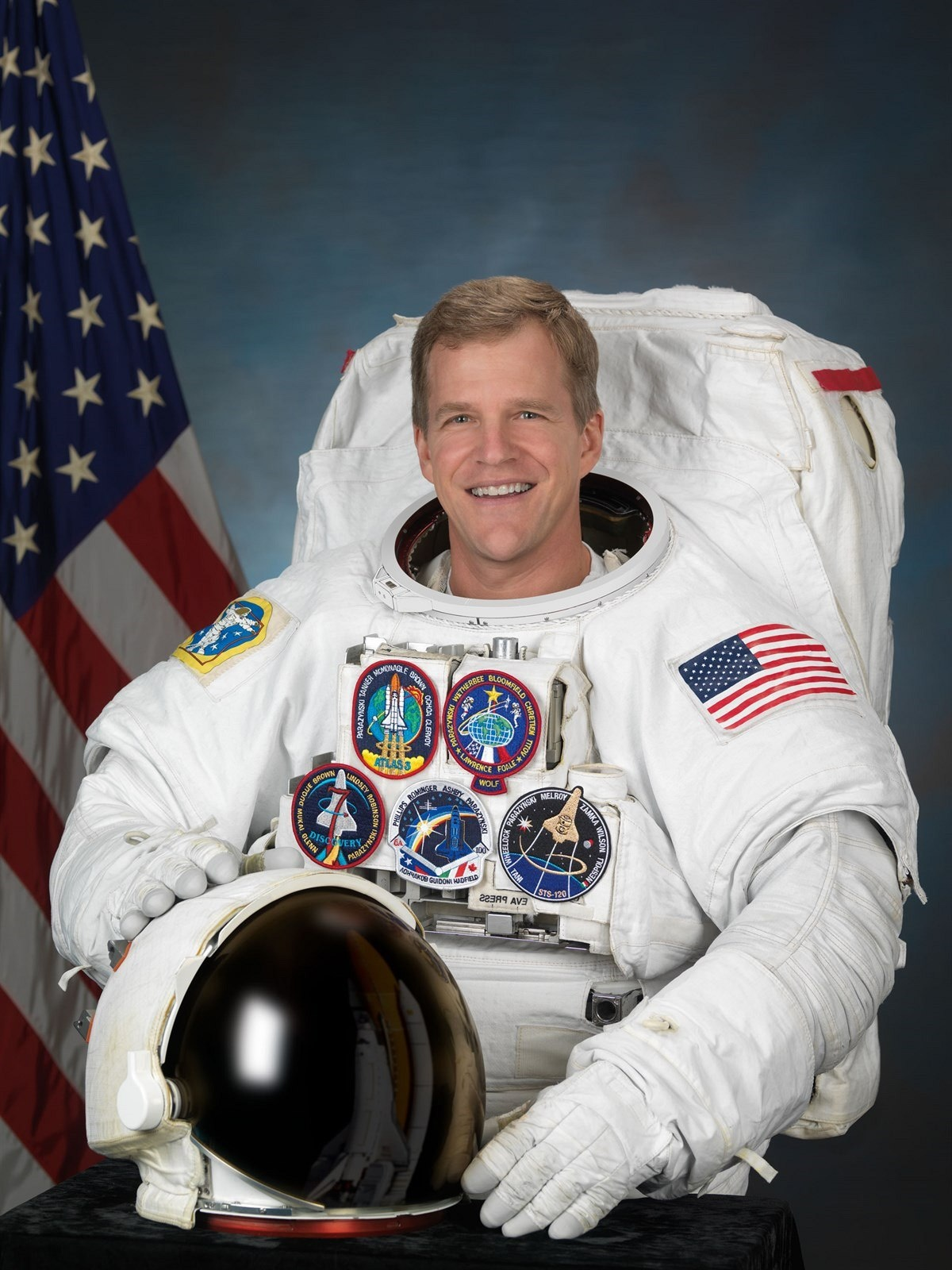
- Official portrait, 2008
- Born: Scott Edward Parazynski; July 28, 1961 (age 65); Little Rock, Arkansas, U.S.
- Education: Stanford University (BS, MD)
- Space career

NASA astronaut
- Time in space: 57d 15h 34m
- Selection: NASA Group 14 (1992)
- Total EVAs: 7
- Total EVA time: 47h 5m
- Mission: STS-66; STS-86; STS-95; STS-100; STS-120
- Retired: March 24, 2009

Scott Edward Parazynski (born July 28, 1961) is an American physician and former NASA astronaut. A veteran of five Space Shuttle flights and seven spacewalks, Parazynski's latest mission was STS-120 in October 2007 – highlighted by a dramatic, unplanned extra-vehicular activity (EVA) to repair a live solar array. In May 2016, he was inducted into the United States Astronaut Hall of Fame. He retired from NASA in March 2009 to pursue entrepreneurial opportunities in the private sector, and he is currently the CEO of a technology start-up. He is the first person to have both flown in space and summited Mount Everest, the highest point on Earth. He describes his life's experiences in his 2017 memoir The Sky Below.

== Personal life ==
Parazynski is of Polish descent, as his great-great-grandparents migrated from Kraków to the US. He considers Palo Alto, California, and Evergreen, Colorado, to be his hometowns. He is married to Meenakshi Wadhwa, a planetary scientist at Arizona State University. He has two children with his first wife, Gail. Scott enjoys mountaineering, rock climbing, flying and scuba diving. A commercial, multi-engine, seaplane and instrument-rated pilot, Parazynski has logged over 2500 flight hours in a variety of aircraft. As a mountaineer, his summits include Cerro Aconcagua (at 22,841 feet (6,962 m) above sea level, the tallest mountain in the world outside Asia) and all 59 of Colorado's peaks over 14,000 feet (4,300 m) in altitude. He first attempted to summit Mount Everest in May 2008, but was forced to turn back before the summit due to a severe back injury. Serving as team physician for the Discovery Channel a year later, at 4:00 am on May 20, 2009, he successfully summited the 29,029 feet (8,848 m) mountain.

Other notable expeditions include a scientific dive into the summit caldera lake atop Licancabur Volcano (19,409 feet (5,916 m) on the Bolivian-Chilean border), one of the world's highest lakes, and setting the first bootprints adjacent Masaya Volcano's lava lake in Nicaragua with Sam Cossman in 2016. He also travelled aboard OceanGate's submersible Titan and visited the wreck of the Titanic in the North Atlantic.

== Education and early life ==
Parazynski attended junior high school at Dakar Academy in Dakar, Senegal, and Beirut, Lebanon. In March 1969 as an eight-year-old, he travelled to Florida to witness the launch of Apollo 9, an event he argued inspired him to pursue a career in science. He attended high school at the Community School, Tehran, Iran, and the American Community School, Athens, Greece, graduating in 1979. He received a Bachelor of Science degree in biology from Stanford University in 1983, continuing on to graduate with honors from Stanford Medical School in 1989. He served his medical internship at the Brigham and Women's Hospital of Harvard Medical School (1990). He had completed 22 months of a residency program in emergency medicine in Denver, Colorado, when selected for the NASA Astronaut Corps.

== Organizations ==
Parazynski is a Fellow of the Aerospace Medical Association and The Explorers Club. Additionally, he is a member of the American Society for Gravitational and Space Biology, the Wilderness Medical Society, the American Alpine Club, the Association of Space Explorers, the Experimental Aircraft Association, and the Aircraft Owners and Pilots Association. He is president of the board of directors of the Challenger Center for Space Science Education, and serves on the boards of the Houston Museum of Natural Science, the University of Texas McDonald Observatory and OceanGate.

In 2014, Parazynski was appointed as a professor of practice at Arizona State University, and was designated ASU's first University Explorer. He subsequently founded Fluidity Technologies based on his intellectual property, a company aiming to manufacture and distribute novel control devices for mobility in 3D space, for everything from drones and computer games to virtual reality and surgical robotics.

== Awards and honors ==
- Boy Scouts of America Eagle Scout (1977)
- National Institutes of Health Predoctoral Training Award in Cancer Biology (1983)
- Rhodes Scholarship finalist (1984)
- NASA Graduate Student Researcher's Award (1988)
- Stanford Medical Scholars Program (1988)
- Research Honors Award from Stanford Medical School (1989)
- NASA-Ames Certificate of Recognition (1990)
- Wilderness Medical Society Research Award (1991)
- Space Station Team Excellence Award (1996)
- NASA Exceptional Service Medals (1998, 1999)
- NASA Space Flight Medals (1994, 1997, 1998, 2001, 2008)
- NASA Distinguished Service Medals (2002, 2009)
- Ellis Island Family Heritage Award (2005)
- Aviation Week Laureate Award (2008)
- Arkansas Aviation Hall of Fame (2008)
- Explorers Club Lowell Thomas Award (2008)
- Honorary captain for the US luge team for the 2010 Winter Olympics (Shared with Ugly Betty television actor Eric Mabius.).
- National Eagle Scout Association's Outstanding Eagle Award (2012)
- Order of Merit of the Republic of Poland (2013)
- Doctor honoris Causa from the Military University of Technology of Warsaw (2013)
- Antarctica Service Medal (2014)
- United States Astronaut Hall of Fame (2016)
- Asteroid (534299) 2014 SP311 was renamed Parazynski (2021)

While in medical school, he competed on the United States Development Luge Team and was ranked among the top ten competitors in the nation during the 1988 Olympic Trials. He also served as an Olympic Team Coach for the Philippines during the 1988 Olympic Winter Games in Calgary, Canada.

== Medical career ==
While an undergraduate at Stanford University, Parazynski studied antigenic shift in African sleeping sickness, using sophisticated molecular biology techniques. During medical school, he was awarded a NASA graduate student fellowship and conducted research at NASA Ames Research Center on fluid shifts that occur during human space flight. Additionally, he has been involved in the design of several exercise devices that are being developed for long-duration space flight, and has conducted research on high-altitude acclimatization. Parazynski has numerous publications in the field of space physiology, and has a particular expertise in human adaptation to stressful environments.

== NASA career ==
Selected as an astronaut in March 1992, Parazynski reported to the Johnson Space Center in August 1992. He completed one year of training and evaluation, and was qualified as a mission specialist. Parazynski initially served as one of the crew representatives for extra-vehicular activity (EVA) in the Astronaut Office Mission Development Branch. Following his first flight, he was assigned as a backup for the third American long-duration stay aboard Russia's space station Mir, and was expected to serve as a prime crew member on a subsequent mission. He spent five months in training at the Gagarin Cosmonaut Training Center, Star City, Moscow, Russia.

In October 1995, when sitting-height parameters raised concerns about his fitting safely in the Soyuz spacecraft in the event of an emergency on board the Mir station, he was deemed too tall for the mission and was withdrawn from Mir training. He has served as the Astronaut Office Operations Planning Branch crew representative for Space Shuttle, Space Station and Soyuz training, and also served as Deputy (Operations and Training) of the Astronaut Office ISS Branch. Most recently, he served as Chief of the Astronaut Office EVA Branch. A veteran of five space flights, STS-66 (1994), STS-86 (1997), STS-95 (1998), STS-100 (2001), and STS-120 (2007), Parazynski has logged over 1,019 hours (8 weeks) in space, including 47 hours of EVA, and traveled over 17 million miles. Parazynski's most recent mission was STS-120, during which he performed four spacewalks to continue International Space Station assembly. The fourth EVA is considered one of the most challenging and dangerous ever performed: while perched on the end of a 90-foot robotic boom, further away from the safety of the airlock than anyone had previously ventured, he had to repair a fully energized solar array. He became only the second NASA astronaut to perform four spacewalks during a single shuttle mission. A photo that he took during one of the spacewalks was listed on Popular Science's photo gallery of the best astronaut selfies.

== Spaceflight experience ==
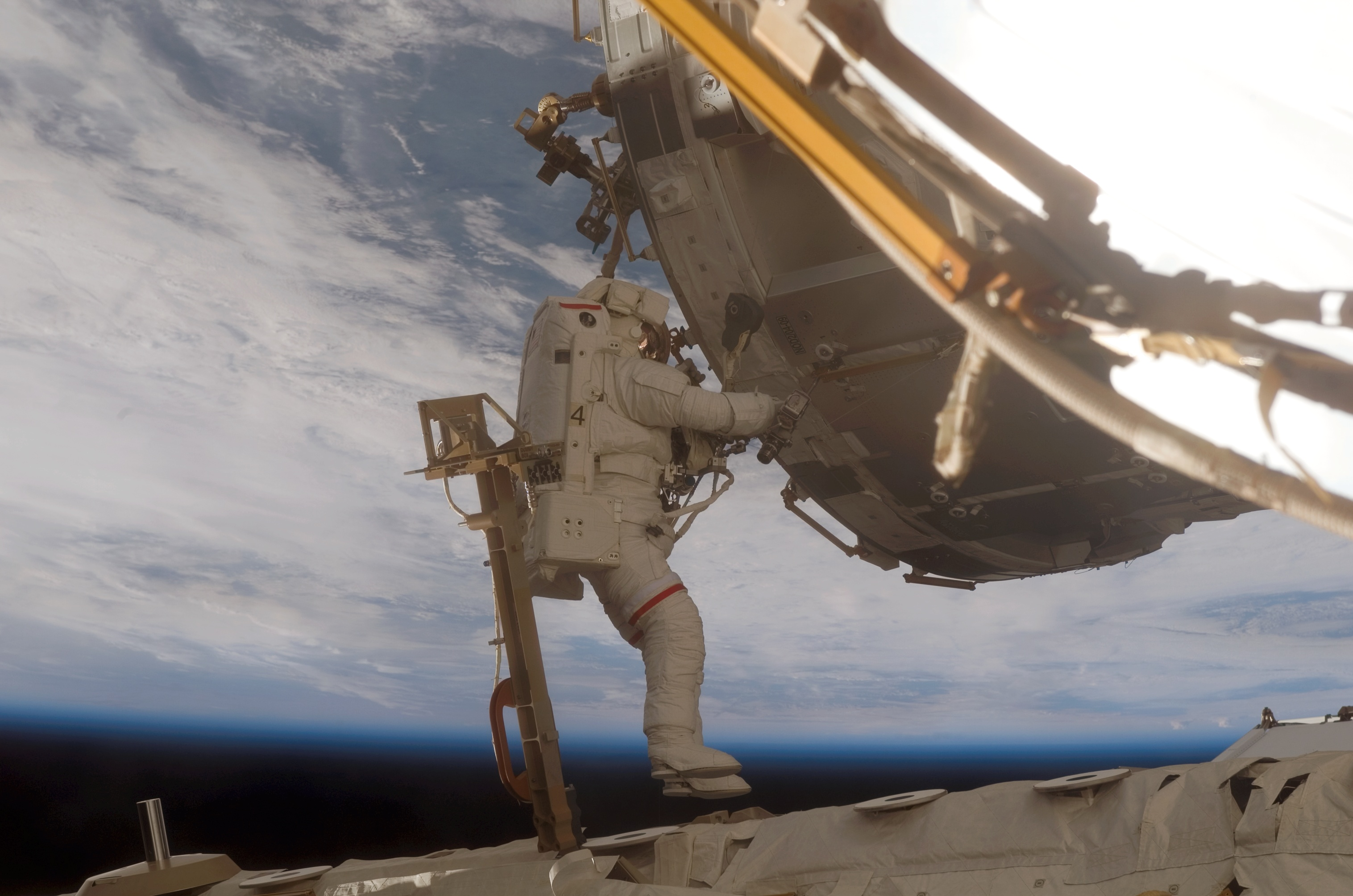
Scott Parazynski during a spacewalk during STS-120.

The STS-66 Atmospheric Laboratory for Applications and Science-3 (ATLAS-3) mission was launched from Kennedy Space Center, Florida, on November 3, 1994, and returned to land at Edwards Air Force Base, California, on November 14, 1994. ATLAS-3 was part of an ongoing program to determine the Earth's energy balance and atmospheric change over an 11-year solar cycle, particularly with respect to humanity's impact on global-ozone distribution. Parazynski had responsibility for a number of on-orbit activities including operation of the ATLAS experiments and Spacelab Pallet, as well as several secondary experiments in the crew cabin. He and his crewmates also successfully evaluated the Interlimb Resistance Device, a free-floating exercise he developed to prevent muscular atrophy in microgravity. Space Shuttle Atlantis circled the earth 175 times and traveled over 4.5 million miles during its 262-hour and 34-minute flight.

STS-86 Atlantis (September 25 to October 6, 1997) was the seventh mission to rendezvous and dock with the Russian Space Station Mir. Highlights of the mission included the exchange of U.S. crew members Michael Foale and David Wolf, the transfer of 10,400 pounds of science and logistics, and the first Shuttle-based joint American-Russian spacewalk. Parazynski served as the flight engineer (MS2) during the flight, and was also the navigator during the Mir rendezvous. Parazynski (EV1) and Russian cosmonaut Vladimir Titov performed a 5-hour, 1 minute spacewalk during which they retrieved four experiment packages first deployed during the STS-76 Shuttle-Mir docking mission. They also deployed the Spektr Solar Array Cap, which was designed to be used in a future Mir spacewalk to seal a leak in the Spektr module's damaged hull. Other objectives of EVA included the evaluation of common EVA tools to be used by astronauts wearing either Russian or American-made spacesuits, and a systems flight test of the Simplified Aid for EVA Rescue (SAFER). Space Shuttle Atlantis circled the Earth 169 times and traveled over 4.2 million miles during its 259-hour and 21-minute flight, landing at the Kennedy Space Center.

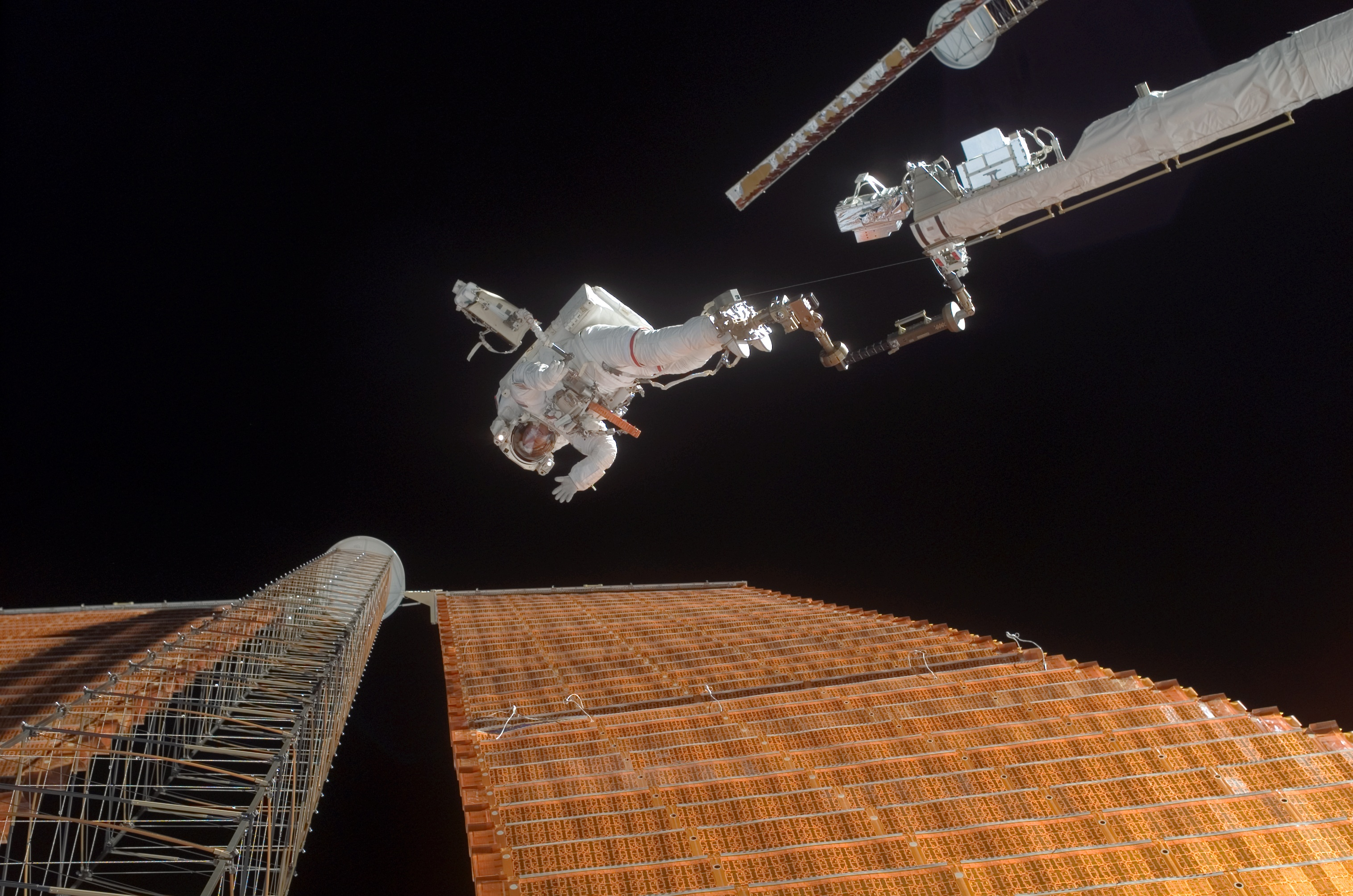
Scott Parazynski during an STS-120 spacewalk to repair a damaged solar panel of the International Space Station.

STS-95 Discovery (October 29 to November 7, 1998) was a nine-day mission during which the crew supported a variety of research payloads, including deployment of the Spartan solar-observing spacecraft and the testing of the Hubble Space Telescope Orbital Systems Test Platform. The crew also conducted investigations on the correlation between space flight and the aging process. Parazynski was the flight engineer (MS2) for the mission, as well as the navigator for the Spartan spacecraft rendezvous. During the flight, he also operated the Shuttle's robotic arm in support of the testing of several space-vision systems being considered for ISS assembly. In addition, he was responsible for monitoring several life sciences investigations, including those involving crewmate Senator John Glenn. The mission was accomplished in 134 Earth orbits, traveling 3.6 million miles in 213 hours and 44 minutes.

STS-100 Endeavour (April 19 to May 1, 2001) was the 9th mission to the International Space Station (ISS) Alpha during which the crew successfully delivered and installed the Space Station "Canadarm2" robotic arm, to be used for all future Space Station assembly and maintenance tasks. Parazynski conducted two spacewalks with Canadian colleague Chris Hadfield to assemble and power the next generation robotic arm. Additionally, the pair installed a new UHF radio antenna for space-to-space communications during Space Shuttle rendezvous and ISS extravehicular activity. A critical on-orbit spare, a direct current switching unit, was also transferred to Alpha during the 14 hours and 50 minutes of EVA work. Also during the flight, Parazynski operated Endeavour's robotic arm to attach, and later detach, the Italian-built Raffaello Multi-Purpose Logistics Module. Traveling 4.9 million miles in 283 hours and 30 minutes, the mission was accomplished in 186 Earth orbits.

STS-120 Discovery (October 23 – November 7, 2007) launched from and returned to land at the Kennedy Space Center, Florida. During the mission, the Node 2 module named Harmony was delivered to the International Space Station. This element opened up the capability for future international laboratories to be added to the station. Parazynski served as EV1 (lead spacewalker) and accumulated over 27 EVA hours in 4 spacewalks. One of the major EVA mission objectives was the relocation of the P6 Solar Array from the top of the Z1 Truss to the end of the port side of the Integrated Truss Structure. During the IVA-commanded re-deploy of the solar array, several array panels snagged and were damaged, requiring an unplanned spacewalk to successfully repair the array. The mission was accomplished in 238 Earth orbits, traveling 6.2 million miles in 15 days, 2 hours, and 23 minutes.

== Book ==
In 2017, Parazynski's book, The Sky Below: A True Story of Summits, Space and Speed, with co-author Susy Flory, was published. Homer Hickam called it “a wonder, a fellow who has packed in more exploits in his lifetime than most of us can imagine.”
