= STS-120 =

2007 American crewed spaceflight to the ISS

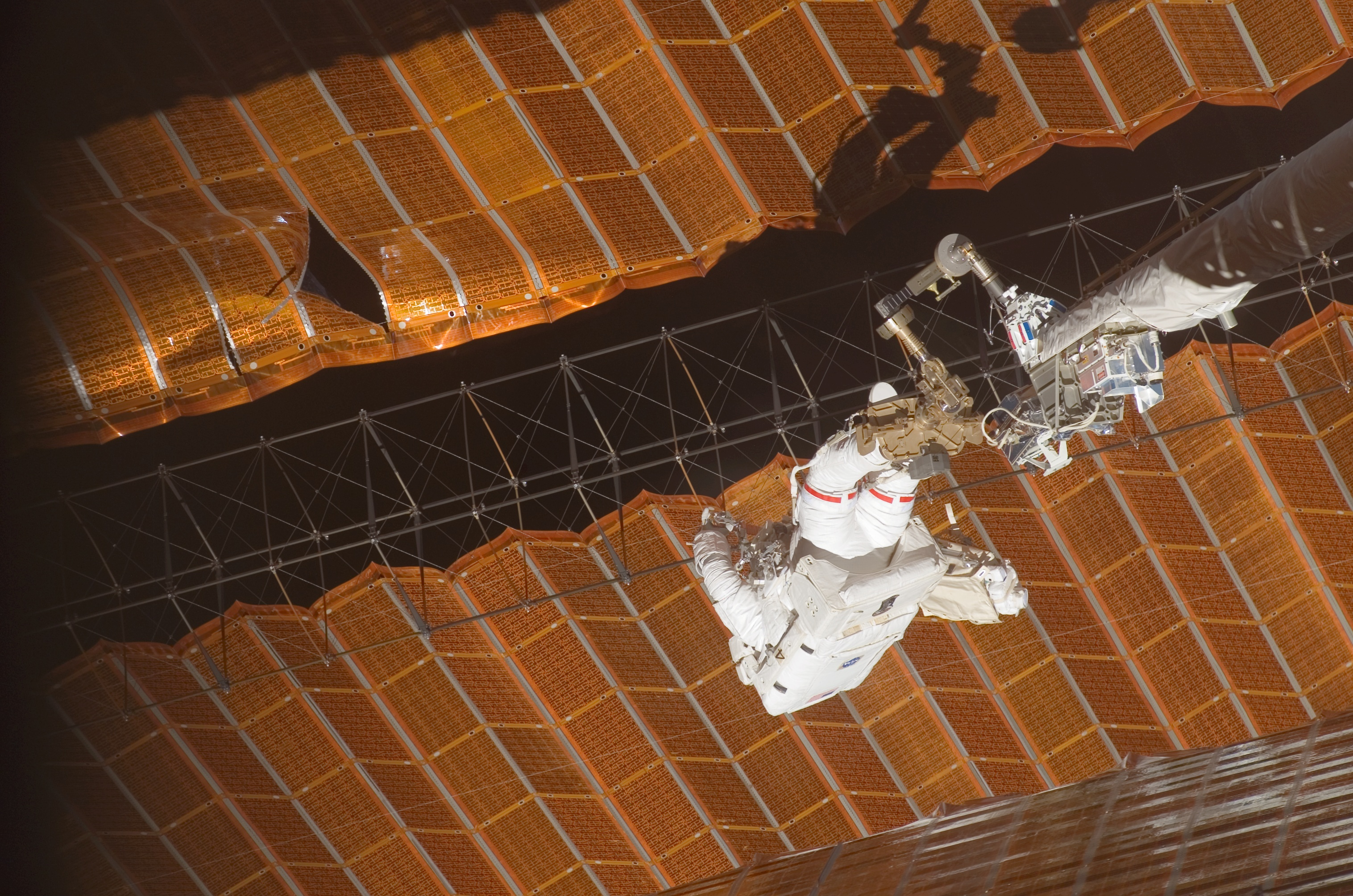
- Scott E. Parazynski performs a repair of a torn solar panel on the P6 truss, reinstalled on the ISS four days earlier.
- Names: Space Transportation System-120
- Mission type: ISS assembly
- Operator: NASA
- COSPAR ID: 2007-050A
- SATCAT no.: 32272
- Mission duration: 15 days, 2 hours, 24 minutes
- Distance travelled: 10,060,000 kilometres (6,250,000 mi)
- Orbits completed: 238

Spacecraft properties
- Spacecraft: Space Shuttle Discovery
- Launch mass: 121,643 kilograms (268,177 lb)
- Landing mass: 91,578 kilograms (201,895 lb)

Crew
- Crew size: 7
- Members: Pamela A. Melroy; George D. Zamka; Douglas H. Wheelock; Stephanie Wilson; Scott E. Parazynski; Paolo A. Nespoli
- Launching: Daniel M. Tani
- Landing: Clayton Anderson

Start of mission
- Launch date: October 23, 2007, 15:38:19 UTC
- Launch site: Kennedy, LC-39A

End of mission
- Landing date: November 7, 2007, 18:01:18 UTC
- Landing site: Kennedy, SLF Runway 33

Orbital parameters
- Reference system: Geocentric
- Regime: Low Earth
- Perigee altitude: 340 kilometres (210 mi)
- Apogee altitude: 344 kilometres (214 mi)
- Inclination: 51.6 degrees
- Period: 91.6 minutes

Docking with ISS
- Docking port: PMA-2 (Destiny forward)
- Docking date: 25 October 2007 12:40 UTC
- Undocking date: 5 November 2007 10:32 UTC
- Time docked: 10 days, 21 hours, 52 minutes
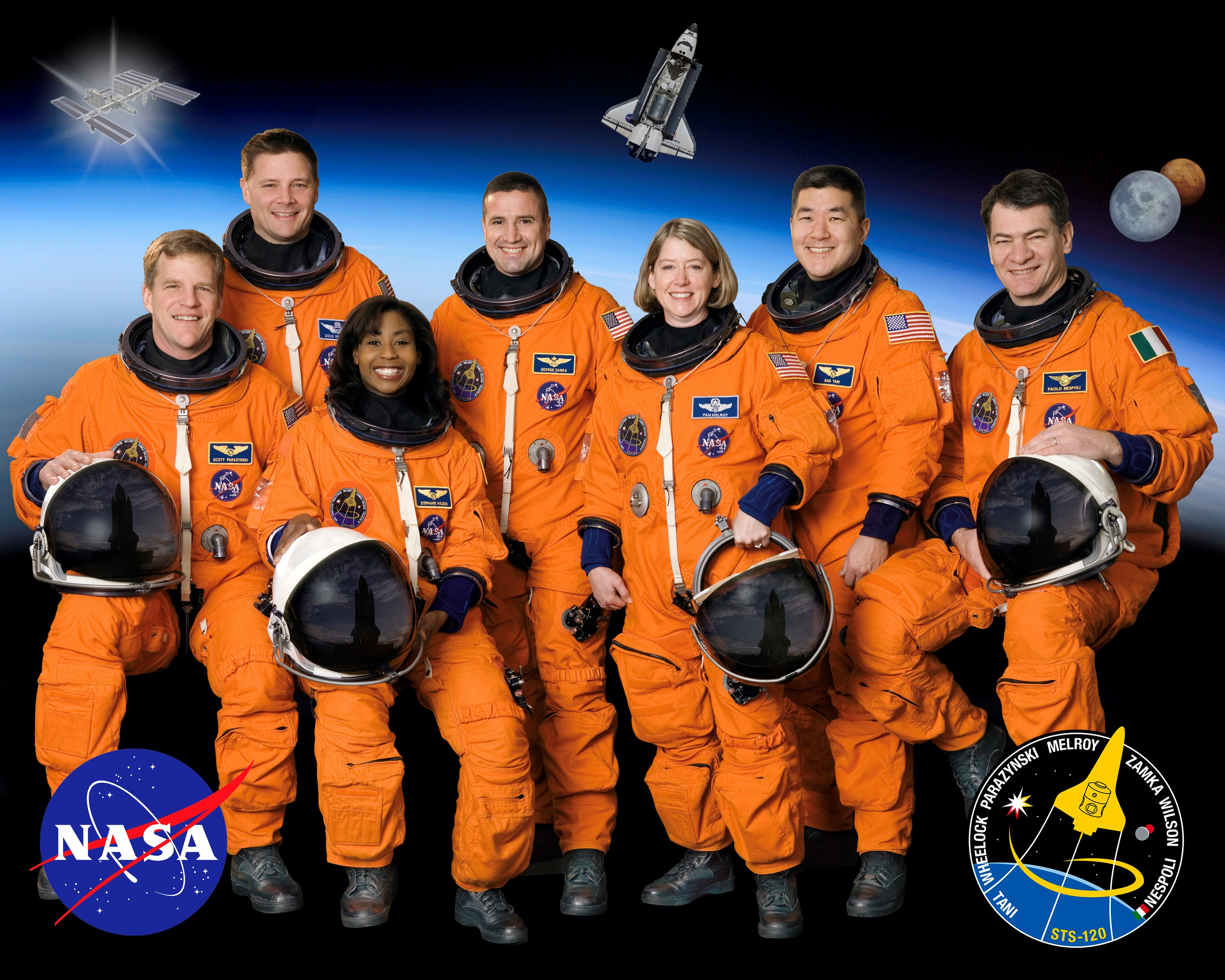
- (left to right) Parazynski, Wheelock, Wilson, Zamka, Melroy, Tani and Nespoli Space Shuttle program

STS-120 was a Space Shuttle mission to the International Space Station (ISS) that launched on October 23, 2007, from the Kennedy Space Center, Florida. The mission is also referred to as ISS-10A by the ISS program. STS-120 delivered the Harmony module and reconfigured a portion of the station in preparation for future assembly missions. STS-120 was flown by Space Shuttle Discovery, and was the twenty-third Space Shuttle mission to the ISS. It was Discovery's 34th flight.

== Crew ==
Position	Launching Astronaut	Landing Astronaut
Commander	(United States) Pamela Melroy; Third and last spaceflight	
Pilot	(United States) George D. Zamka; First spaceflight	
Mission Specialist 1	(United States) Douglas H. Wheelock; First spaceflight	
Mission Specialist 2 Flight Engineer	(United States) Stephanie Wilson; Second spaceflight	
Mission Specialist 3	(United States) Scott E. Parazynski; Fifth and last spaceflight	
Mission Specialist 4	(Italy) Paolo A. Nespoli, ESA; First spaceflight	
Mission Specialist 5	(United States) Daniel M. Tani; Expedition 16; Second and last spaceflight ISS Flight Engineer	(United States) Clayton Anderson; Expedition 16; First spaceflight ISS Flight Engineer

=== Crew notes ===
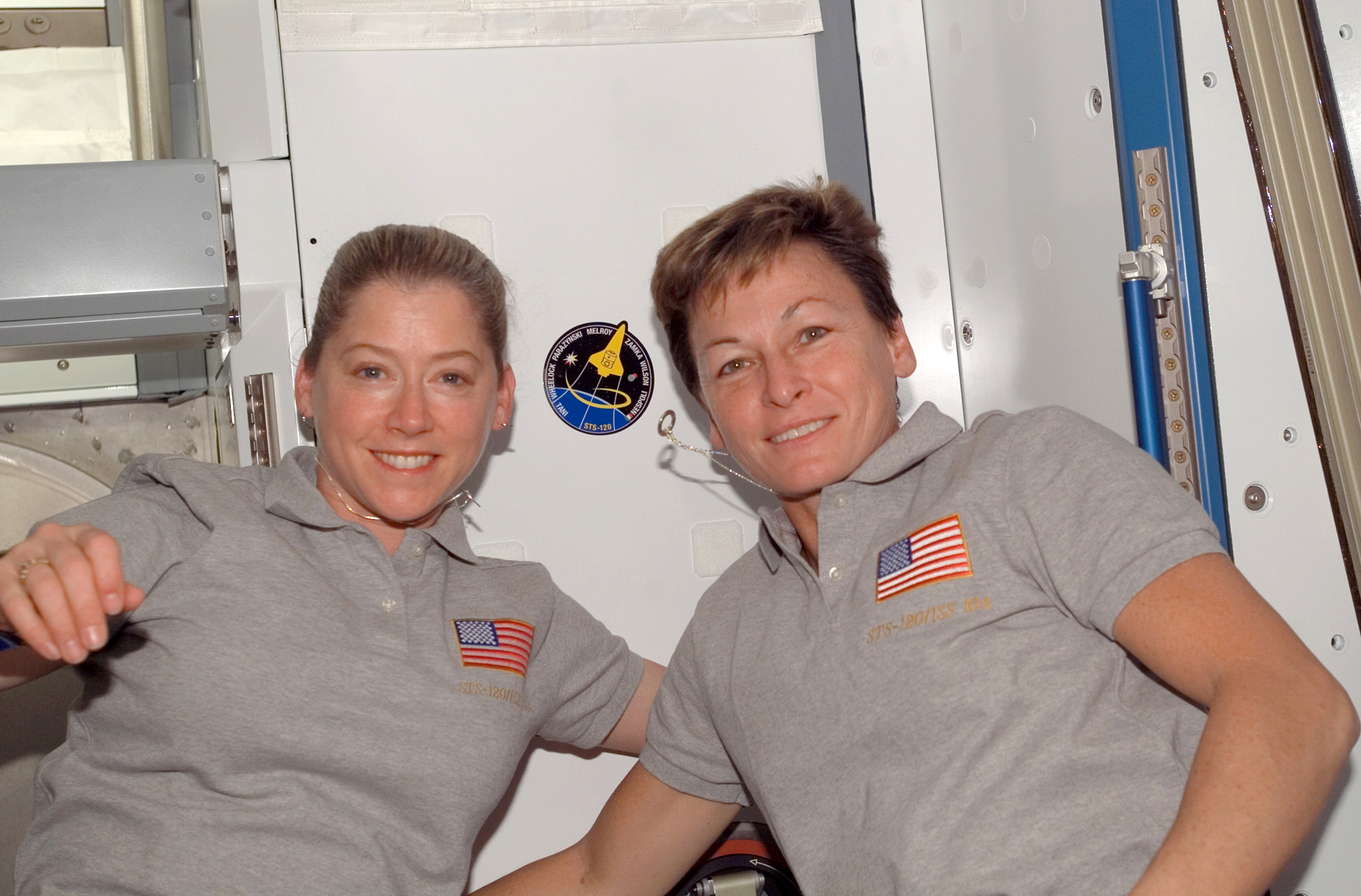
Two commanders: Melroy and Whitson place the STS-120 mission insignia on the wall of the newly installed Harmony module.

As commander of STS-120, Pamela Melroy became the second woman (after Eileen Collins) to command a Space Shuttle mission. Additionally, the Expedition 16 crew that received STS-120 was commanded by Peggy Whitson, the first female ISS commander. The flight of STS-120 thus became the first time two female mission commanders were in space at the same time.

=== Crew prior to the Space Shuttle Columbia disaster ===
Prior to the Space Shuttle Columbia disaster, the original crew manifest for STS-120 was:

Position	Astronaut
Commander	James D. Halsell; Sixth spaceflight
Pilot	Alan G. Poindexter; First spaceflight
Mission Specialist 1	Wendy Lawrence; Fourth spaceflight
Mission Specialist 2 Flight Engineer	Stephanie Wilson; First spaceflight
Mission Specialist 3	Piers Sellers; Second spaceflight
Mission Specialist 4	Michael Foreman; First spaceflight

The STS-120 mission patch was designed by Michael Foreman before he was reassigned to STS-123.

=== Crew seat assignments ===
Seat	Launch	Landing	Seats 1–4 are on the flight deck. Seats 5–7 are on the mid-deck.
1	Melroy		Seats 1–4 are on the flight deck. Seats 5–7 are on the mid-deck.
2	Zamka		Seats 1–4 are on the flight deck. Seats 5–7 are on the mid-deck.
3	Parazynski	Nespoli	Seats 1–4 are on the flight deck. Seats 5–7 are on the mid-deck.
4	Wilson		Seats 1–4 are on the flight deck. Seats 5–7 are on the mid-deck.
5	Wheelock		Seats 1–4 are on the flight deck. Seats 5–7 are on the mid-deck.
6	Nespoli	Parazynski	Seats 1–4 are on the flight deck. Seats 5–7 are on the mid-deck.
7	Tani	Anderson	Seats 1–4 are on the flight deck. Seats 5–7 are on the mid-deck.

== Mission payloads ==
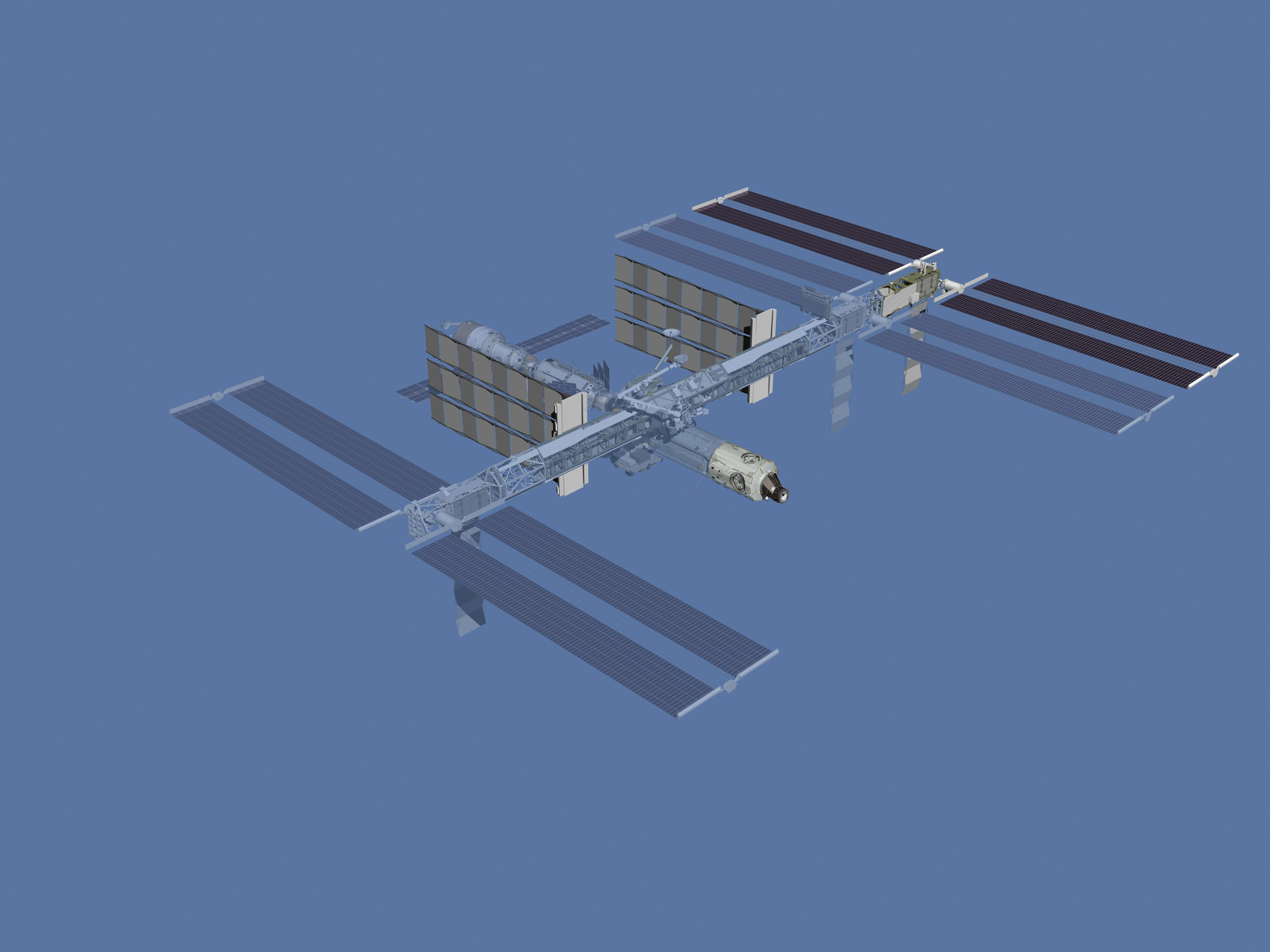
Illustration of the ISS after STS-120, highlighting addition of the Harmony node.

Location	Cargo	Mass
Bay 1–2	Orbiter Docking System; EMU 3010 / EMU 3017	1,800 kilograms (4,000 lb)
Bay 3P	Shuttle Power; Distribution Unit (SPDU)	~100 kilograms (220 lb)
Bay 4S	SASA FSE (Fixture for return of S-band Antenna)	~100 kilograms (220 lb)
Bay 5P	Power/Data Grapple; Fixture (PDGF) for Node 2	~50 kilograms (110 lb)
Bay 6S	Main Bus Switching; Unit (MBSU) and adapter	360 kilograms (790 lb)
Bay 7P	Shuttle Power; Distribution Unit (SPDU)	~100 kilograms (220 lb)
Bay 8–12	Harmony (Node 2)	14,288 kilograms (31,500 lb)
Sill	OBSS 203	~450 kilograms (990 lb)
Sill	RMS 301	~410 kilograms (900 lb)
	Total:	17,300 kilograms (38,100 lb)

=== Harmony (Node 2) ===
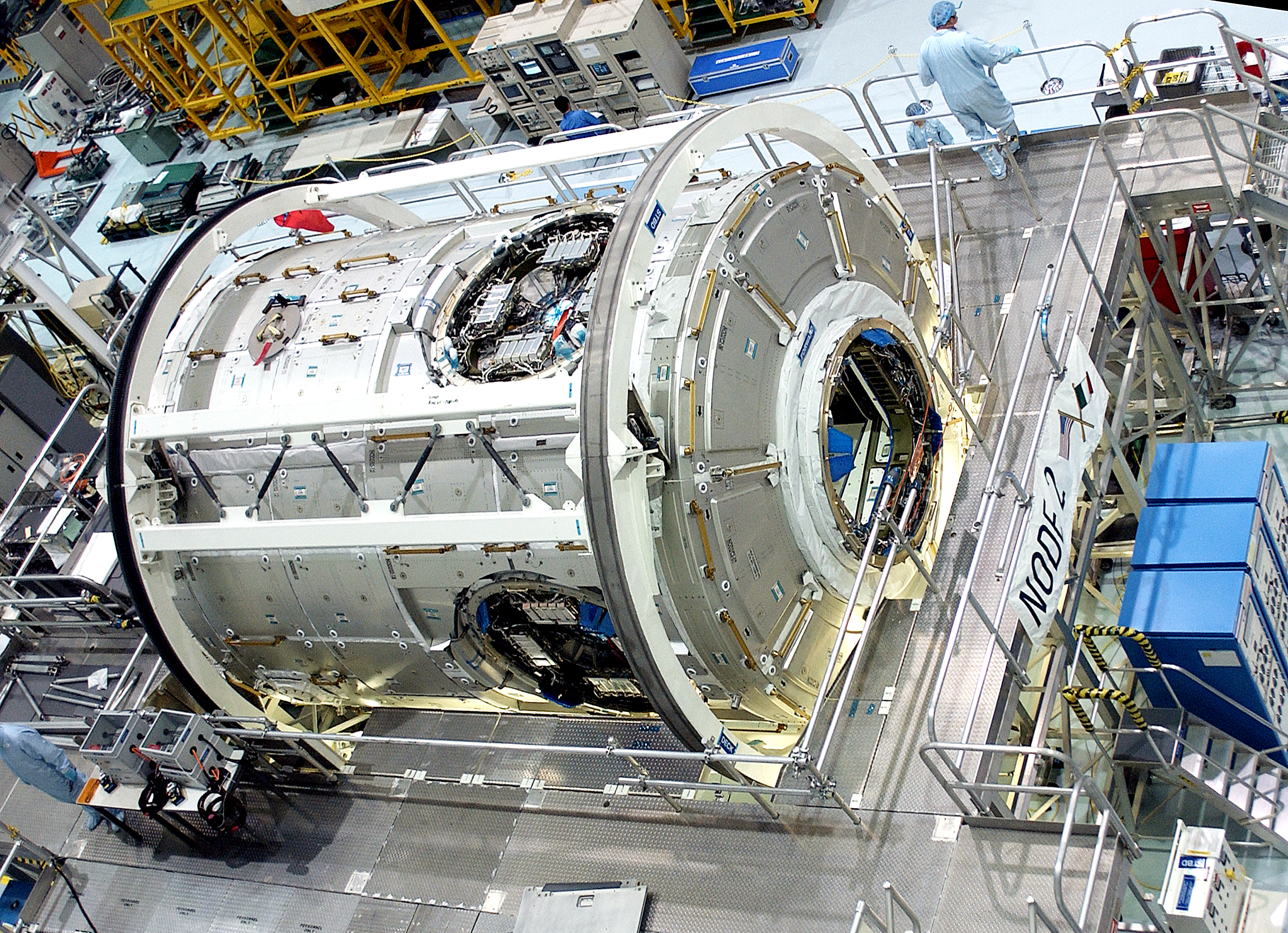
Harmony under assembly at the SSPF

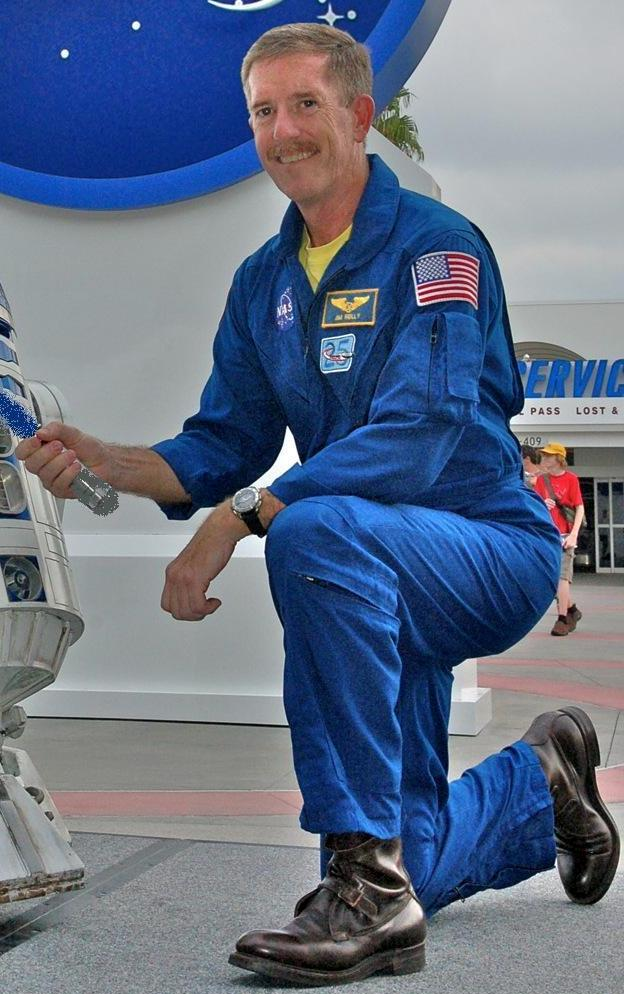
Astronaut Jim Reilly helped welcome R2-D2 and Luke Skywalker's lightsaber from Star Wars to the Kennedy Space Center.

STS-120 delivered launch package 10A to the International Space Station (ISS). It consisted of the U.S. Harmony module (also known as Node 2), with four DC-to-DC Converter Unit (DDCU) racks and three Zero-g Storage Racks (ZSR) installed; a Power and Data Grapple Fixture (PDGF) for the station's robot arm, and a Shuttle Power Distribution Unit (SPDU). Harmony was manufactured for NASA by Thales Alenia Space in Turin, Italy, as part of an agreement between NASA and the European Space Agency and was the first pressurized habitable module delivered to the station since the Pirs docking compartment was installed in August 2001.

Since STS-120 docked to the Pressurized Mating Adapter-2 (PMA-2) on the forward port of the Destiny module, installation of Harmony occurred in two stages: STS-120 installed Harmony to the port node of the Unity module. After Discovery undocked, the station's robotic arm detached PMA-2 from Destiny, and moved it to the forward port of Harmony. Following the relocation of PMA-2, the robotic arm was used to move Harmony from its initial position to its final position, on the forward port of Destiny.

The final positioning of Harmony allowed for the later installation of the European Columbus and Japanese Kibō research modules, which were attached to the side ports of Harmony.

=== P6 relocation ===
During STS-120, the P6 solar arrays were moved from the Z1 truss on top of Unity, to their final position at the port end of the truss.

=== Outreach ===
STS-120 carried the signatures of over 500,000 students that participated in the 2007 Student Signatures in Space program, jointly sponsored by NASA and Lockheed Martin. In celebration of Space Day in May 2007, students from over 500 schools around the world signed giant posters. Their signatures were scanned onto a disk, and the disk was manifested on the STS-120 mission.

Also during STS-120, the lightsaber used by actor Mark Hamill in the 1983 film Return of the Jedi was flown to the station and returned to Earth. Stowed on-board Discovery for the length of the mission, the prop was flown in honor of the 30th anniversary of the Star Wars franchise. On August 28, 2007, Chewbacca from the Star Wars films presented the lightsaber to NASA officials from Space Center Houston, in an official ceremony at Oakland International Airport. The lightsaber was then flown to Houston, where it was greeted by Stormtroopers. The lightsaber will be displayed at Space Center Houston.

== Mission background ==
At the time of the Columbia disaster, STS-120 was scheduled for early 2004. It was delayed repeatedly until October 23, 2007.

NASA originally scheduled the launch for October 20, 2007, but due to the International Space Station program requirement, launch was delayed to October 23, 2007.

In light of the small gouge to the underside of Endeavour that occurred on STS-118, in August 2007, NASA managers announced that they expected to add a fifth spacewalk to the STS-120 mission, designed to test a heat-shield repair tool. The repair technique was originally scheduled for a flight in 2008, but following STS-118, it was decided to move up the testing. The repair tool, called a TPS (thermal protection system) repair ablator dispenser (T-RAD), has never been tested in space, so the spacewalk would have allowed managers to evaluate its effectiveness in low gravity environments. During the course of the mission, issues with the S4 starboard Solar Alpha Rotary Joint (SARJ), and P6 Solar Array, deferred this test objective to a future mission.

The mission marked:

- 151st NASA crewed spaceflight
- 120th Space Shuttle flight since STS-1
- 34th flight of Discovery
- 95th post-Challenger mission
- 7th post-Columbia mission

== Mission timeline ==
=== Launch preparations ===
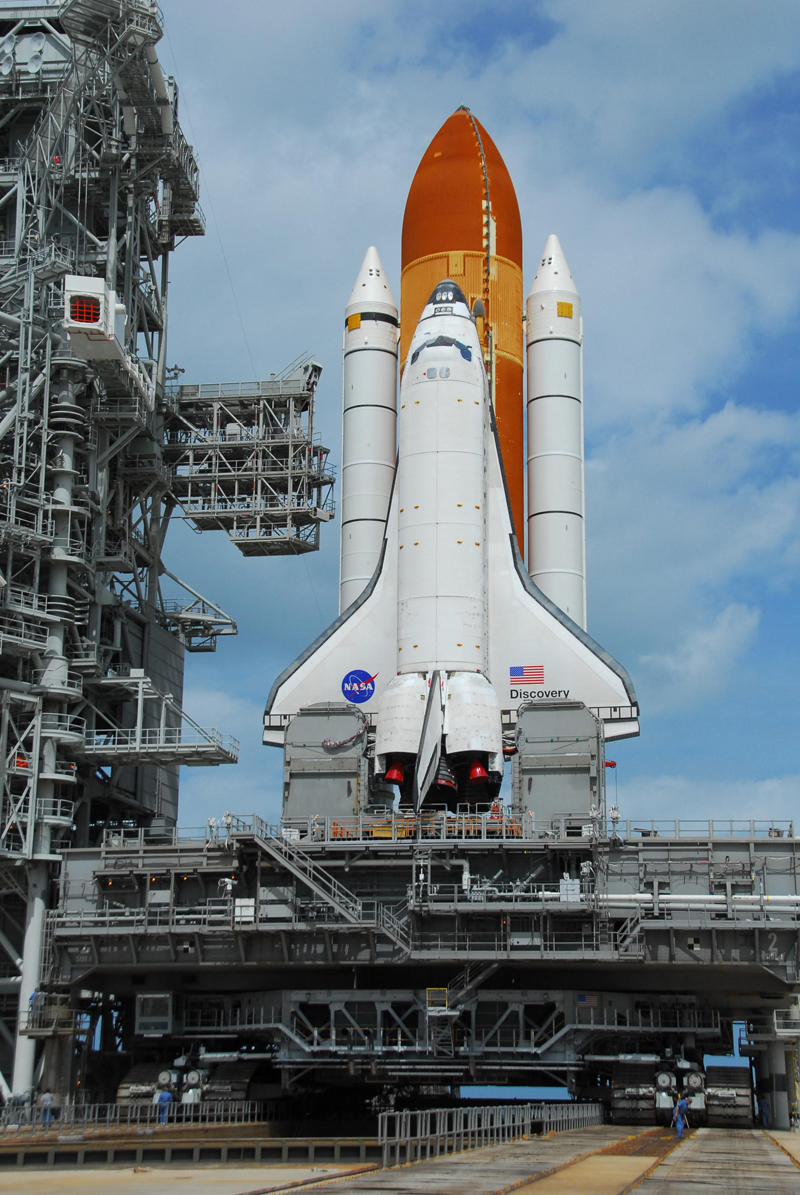
Discovery moved to LC-39A on September 30, 2007.

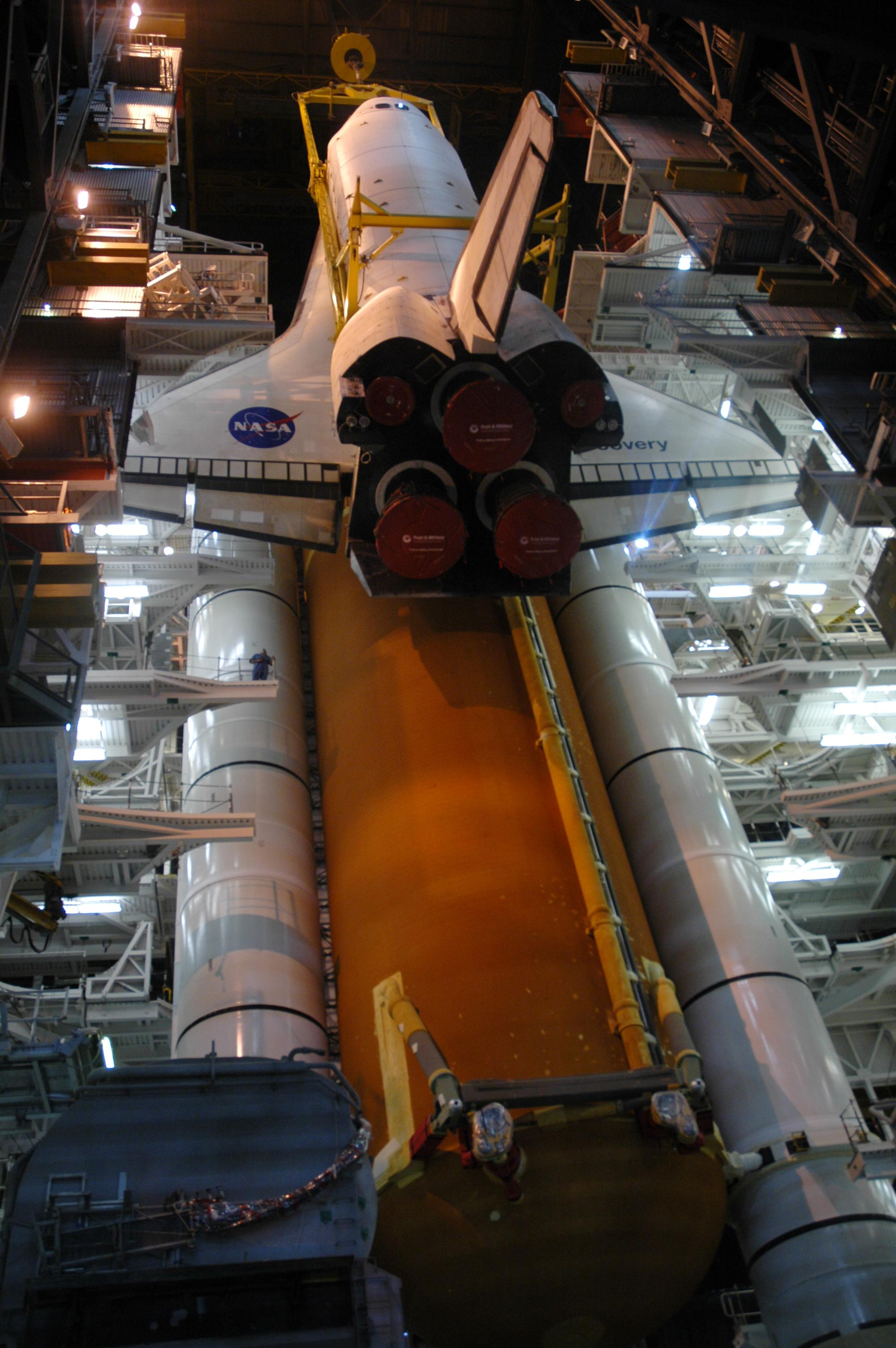
Discovery's external tank mated to the Solid Rocket Boosters.

Following STS-118 in August 2007, NASA managers decided to make modifications to the external tank to be used on STS-120, and modify the liquid oxygen feed-line brackets. The change involved a new low-density foam application, and thinner gaskets. Shuttle Program Managers decided to do this to reduce the foam loss from the area that had been noted since STS-114's "Return to Flight" mission in 2005. STS-118 had a small gouge on the belly of the orbiter due to a chunk of foam that impacted during launch in August 2007. The week of September 17, 2007, NASA managers decided to delay Discovery's rollover to the Vehicle Assembly Building (VAB), due to a hydraulic fluid leak from the right main landing gear strut. The strut repair was successfully completed on September 19, 2007. Discovery then moved to the VAB, and was mated to the External Tank and Solid Rocket Boosters. Perched atop the mobile launcher platform, Discovery arrived at Launch complex 39A on September 30, 2007.

The crew of STS-120 arrived at Kennedy Space Center on October 7, 2007, and began final preparations, including the terminal countdown demonstration test, or "Dress Rehearsal", scheduled for October 7, 2007, through October 10, 2007.

On October 9, 2007, NASA's Engineering and Safety Center, an independent review group set up after the 2003 Columbia disaster, advised replacement of three of Discovery's reinforced carbon-carbon (RCC) panels on the leading wing edge, due to a loss of small amounts of the protective silicon-carbide coating. NASA reviewed the issue of oxidation of the panels for several months, using a variety of specialized testing methods, including thermography. These tests showed that the panels had not worsened over the course of the past two flights of Discovery, and the orbiter project engineers concluded in August that Discovery was safe to launch as is. Had a decision been made to repair the panels, the orbiter would have been rolled back to the VAB, delaying the launch.

On October 16, 2007, NASA Managers completed the Flight Readiness Review, and held a press conference to announce the mission plan. The issue of the RCC panels raised by NESC was found to be of little immediate concern, because the NESC took pre-flight thermography data from Endeavour and compared it with Discovery, but there was no commonality in flight history between the two vehicles. The research showed no significant difference between the panels prior to STS-114, and the panels today, which indicates the coating has not worsened during the previous flights, adding confidence that Discovery's RCC panels have had no deterioration in the flights since. NASA announced on the main shuttle page that "The Space Shuttle Program has determined that Discovery's astronauts can safely carry out their mission without having to replace the panels."

=== October 23 (Flight Day 1, Launch) ===
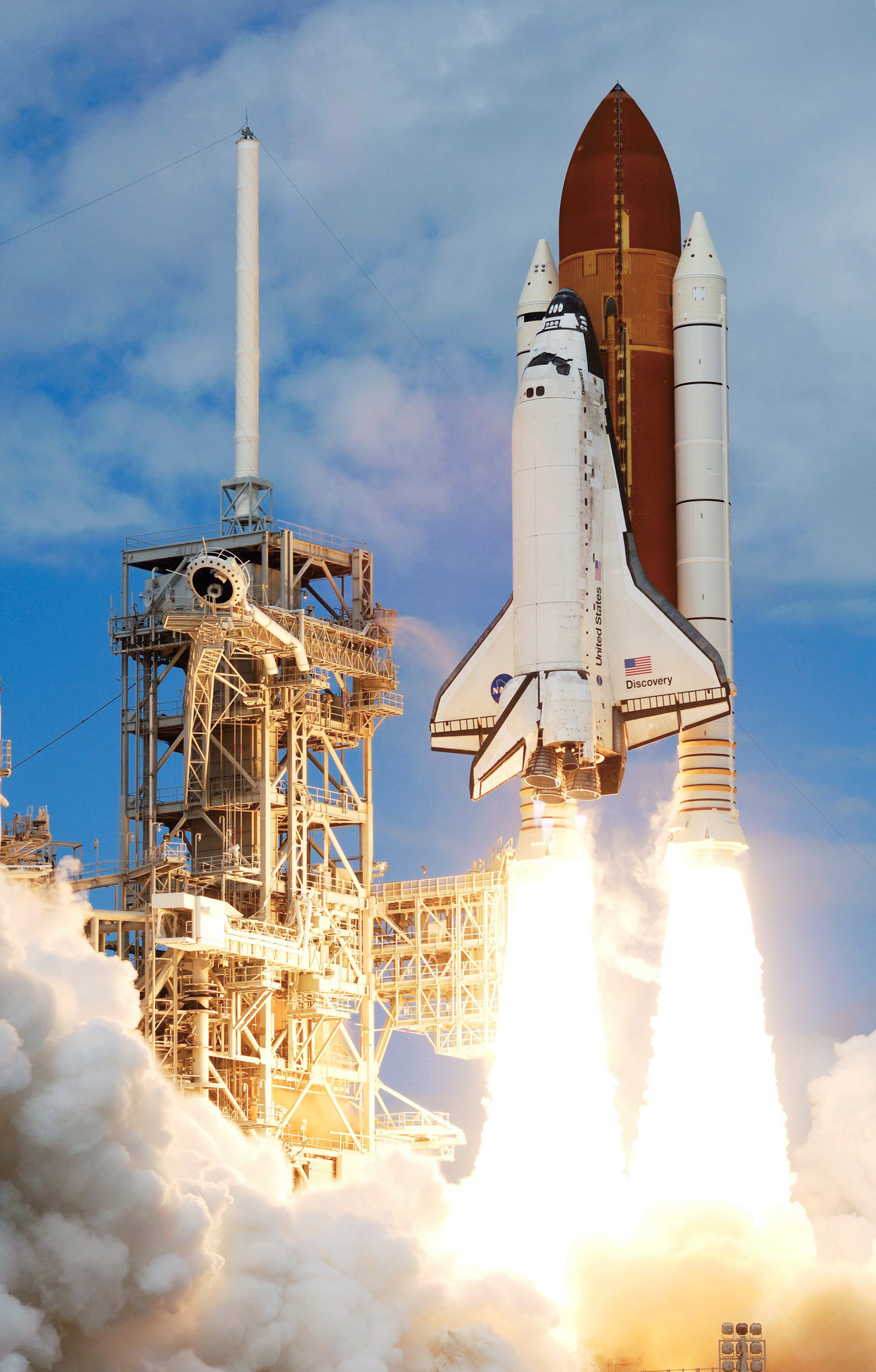
STS-120 begins its mission.

Discovery launched on time at 11:38 EDT (15:38 UTC). In the countdown's final minutes, a piece of ice, measuring 4 inches (10 cm) x .5 inches (1.3 cm) was seen on the hydrogen umbilical between the orbiter and the external tank. The inspection team was called back to the pad (a contingency that has been practiced, and used before), to get a closer look at the ice build-up. NASA flight controllers deemed it too small to pose a threat to the thermal protection system. The ice was attached to a Kapton purge barrier near the LH2 umbilical pyrotechnic canister closeout. It had been shown in tests that ice on this liner, sometimes called a "baggie", would likely come off at main engine ignition. Had it been on other metal surfaces around the liner, this may have posed a threat of staying on and breaking off at a critical part of launch. Despite these issues, the launch continued as planned. The forecast for launch initially was a 60% chance of weather prohibiting launch, and although the launch team weather officers were tracking an incoming storm, the weather remained favorable for launch. Present for the launch was George Lucas, to see off the Star Wars lightsaber. In a press briefing following launch, NASA managers noted a few "events" involving debris, but they occurred later in ascent, after the period of maximum aerodynamic velocity and speed, and were not concerning.

=== October 24 (Flight day 2) ===
The crew of STS-120 spent their first full day in space by performing the RCC survey, using the Shuttle Remote Manipulator System (SRMS), and the Orbiter Boom Sensor System (OBSS). The crew also worked on various tasks such as inspecting the Extravehicular Mobility Units (EMUs, or spacesuits) that will be used on the EVAs, and doing some preliminary work to get ready for docking with the International Space Station on Thursday. Deputy Shuttle Program Manager and Mission Management Team (MMT) chairman John Shannon noted during the status briefing that the preliminary data the team had reviewed showed no items of concern, and the ascent imagery showed no significant losses prior to SRB separation. Shannon said there were several items the team was waiting for higher resolution imagery to assess, including a possible protruding gap filler, and some external tank foam losses, but there was nothing to indicate any problems. Shannon also noted that a vapor trail was seen coming off the external tank for several seconds during launch, but noted that this was a condition seen during both STS-114, and STS-121, and was found to be condensate coming off the back side of the tank. Due to the temperature and humidity, combined with the angle of the Sun for Discovery's launch, the plume appeared more dramatic in some of the imagery. This was considered an "expected condition", and Shannon confirmed it was of no concern.

=== October 25 (Flight day 3) ===
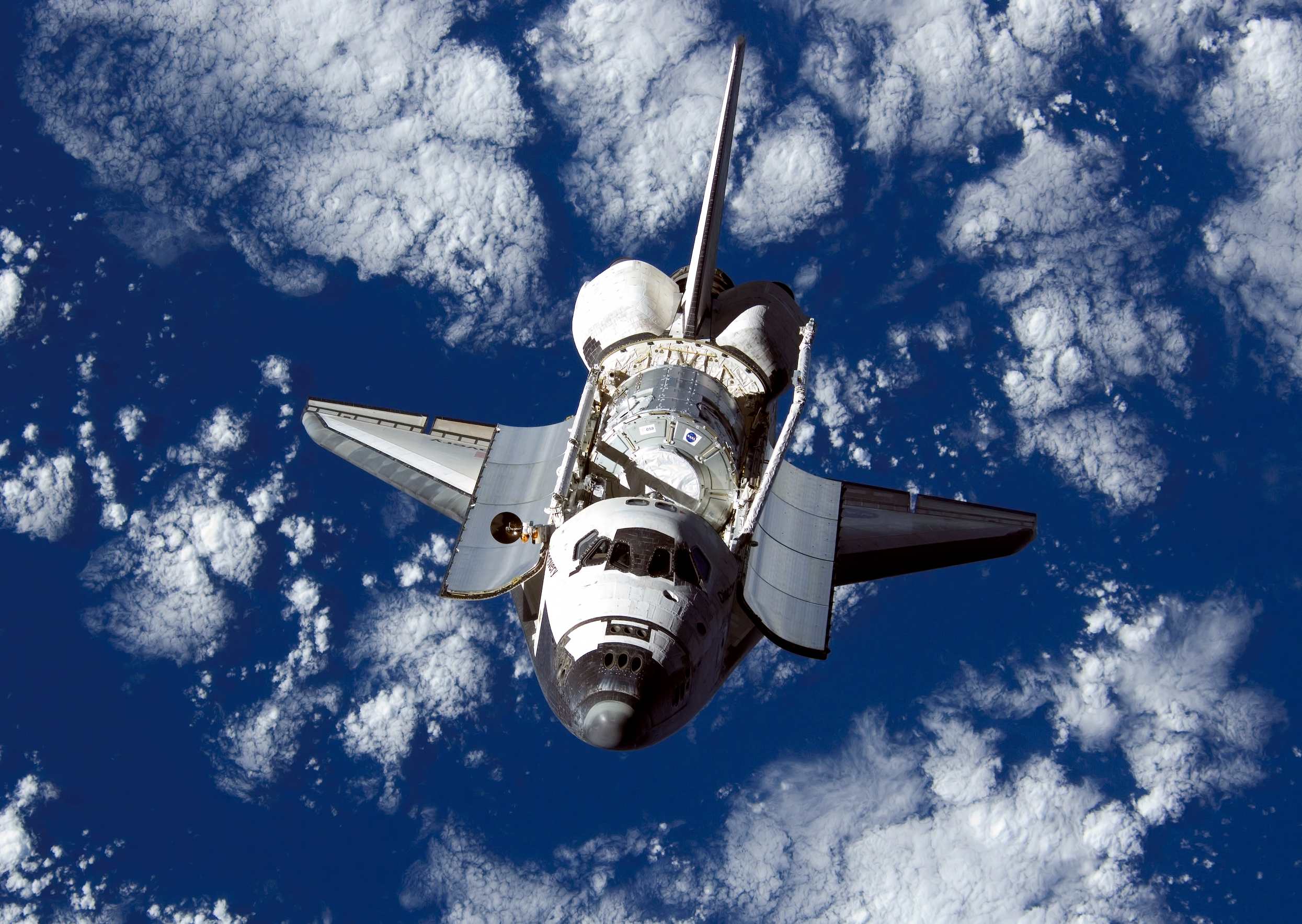
Backdropped by a blue and white Earth, Space Shuttle Discovery approaches the International Space Station.

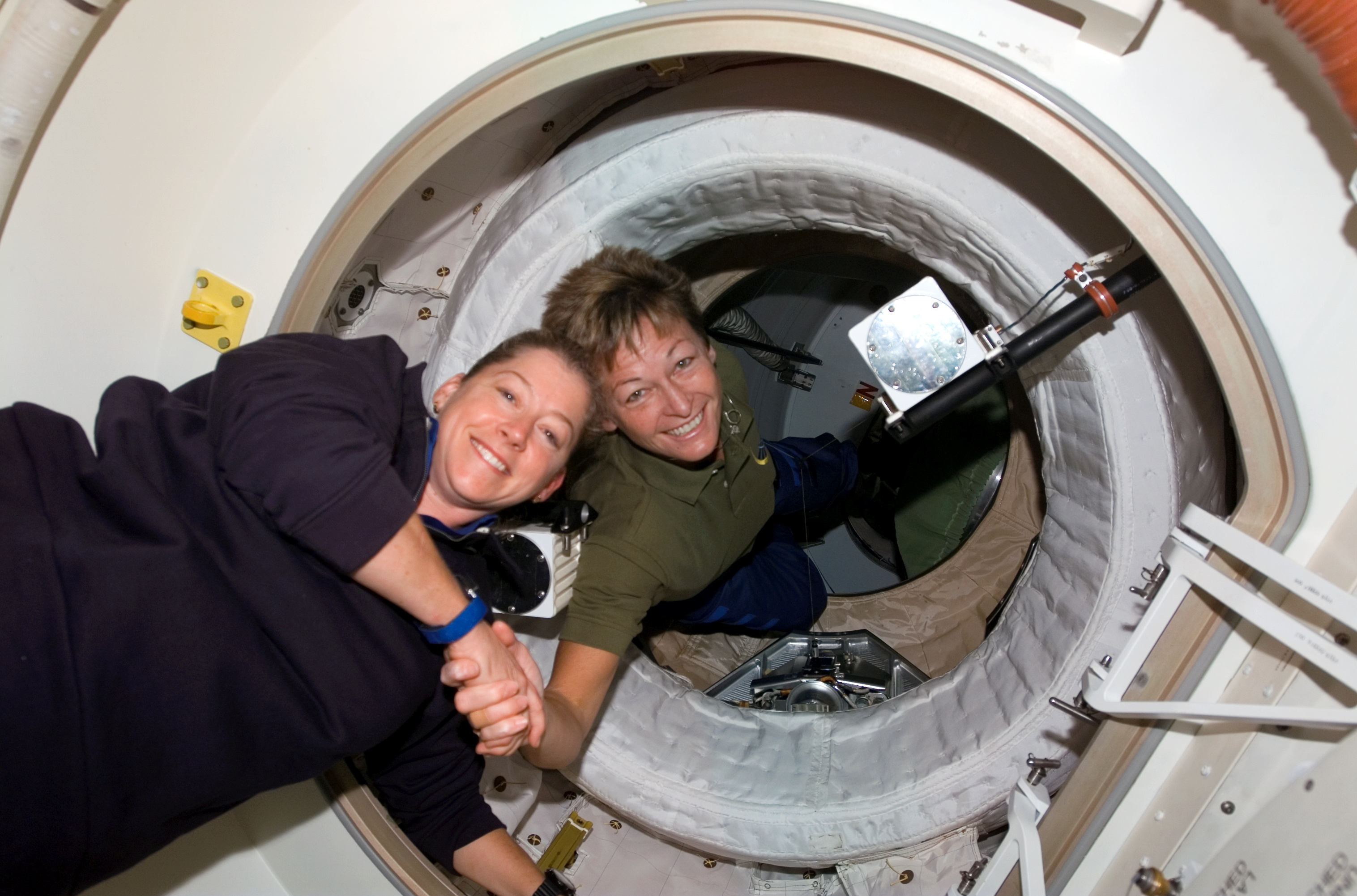
Whitson (right), Expedition 16 commander, greets STS-120 commander Melroy after opening the hatches between the station and the shuttle.

The crew of STS-120 worked through the rendezvous procedures in the morning leading to the rendezvous pitch maneuver which began at 11:34 UTC. Following the RPM, the crew was given the "Go" to dock with the station, and successful docking to the International Space Station occurred at 12:40 UTC. Following docking, the joint crews conducted a station safety review, and Tani's custom Soyuz seatliner was transferred from Discovery to the Soyuz TMA-11, with Anderson's seat liner taken into Discovery. This marked the official end of Expedition 16 for Anderson, and the start of Tani's increment. Just before the two crews signed off to sleep, they were informed that after preliminary review of the RPM photography, focused inspection of the orbiter's heat shield would not be required. During the MMT briefing, Shannon confirmed that initial evaluation of the available data showed Discovery to be a "pretty clean vehicle". He also confirmed they were not working any issues or items of interest. Shannon said the piece of ice that was looked at prior to launch dislodged during main engine ignition, and as it fell, the ice appeared to graze the underside of the orbiter at the beginning of ascent, but the area around the impact site was in good condition, and the ice did not appear to have caused any damage. Shannon said the teams would continue to evaluate the imagery and data, but the shuttle was in a good configuration.

=== October 26 (Flight day 4) ===
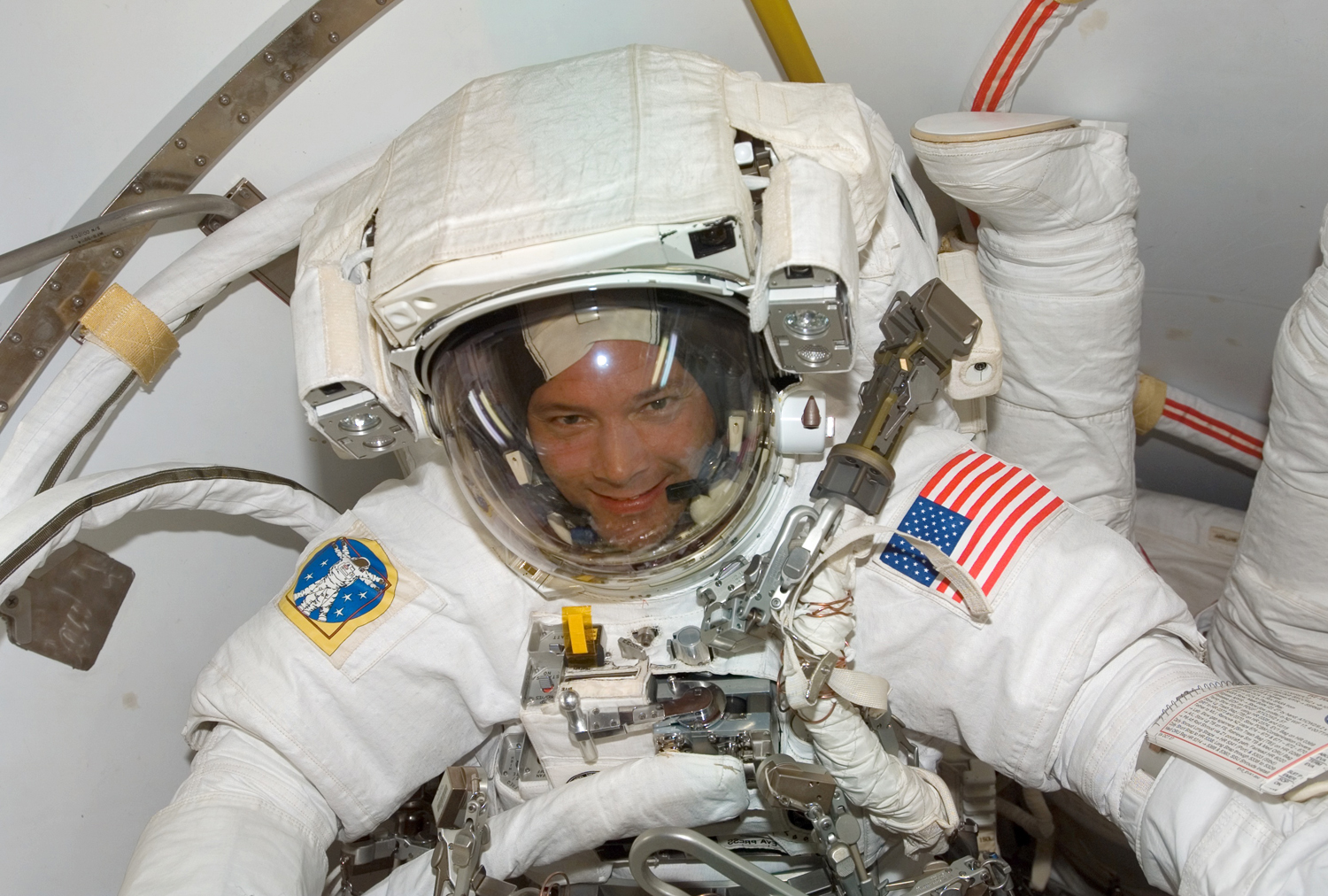
Wheelock prepares for his first EVA. Behind him, Parazynski floats upside down.

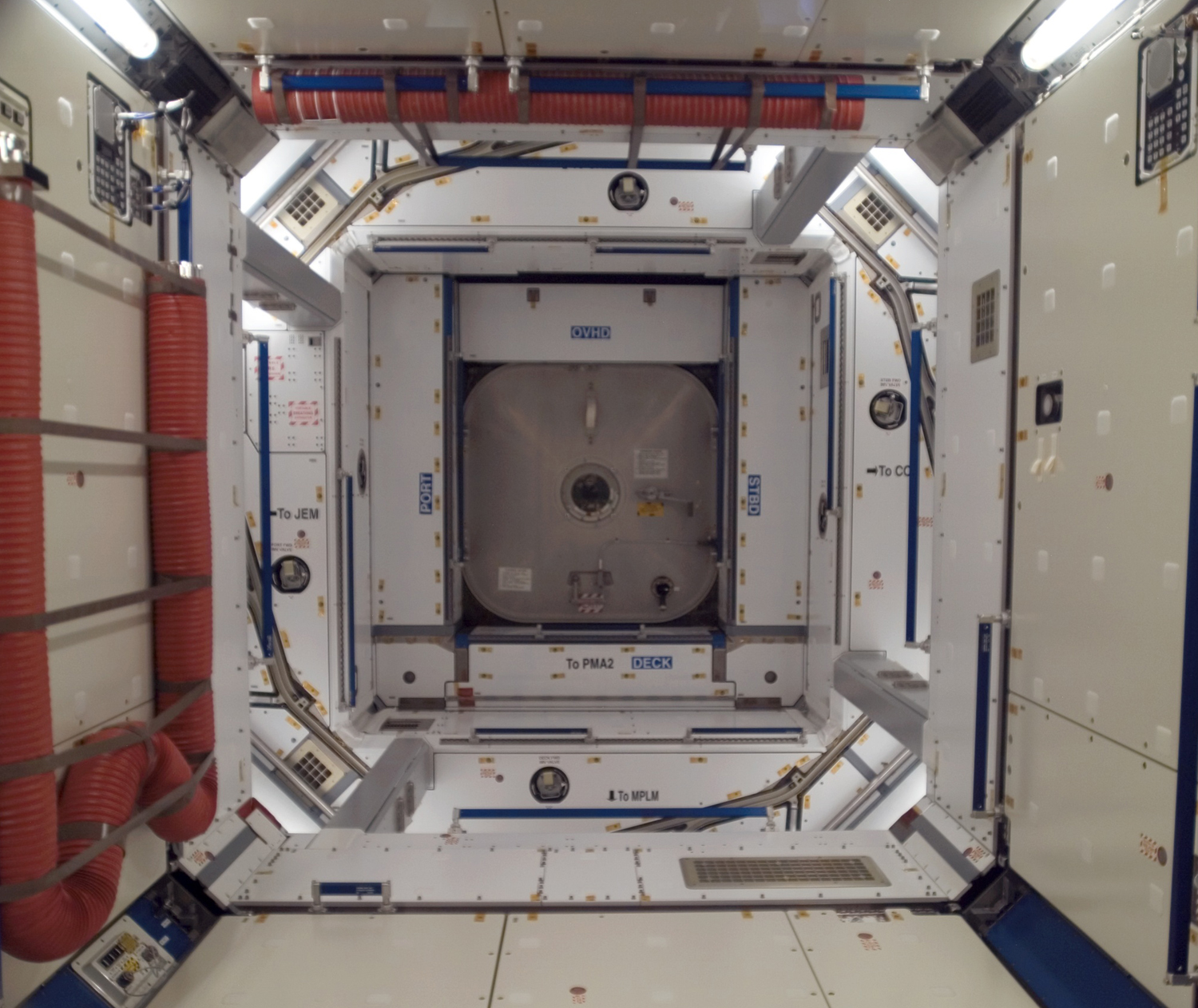
The interior of Harmony as seen following its attachment to the ISS on flight day 5.

The two crews started the day by preparing for the mission's first spacewalk, which began at 10:02 UTC, and ended at 16:16 UTC. Parazynski and Wheelock successfully completed all EVA activities, including preparing Harmony for removal from the payload bay. Wilson, Tani, and Anderson controlled the station's robotic arm, moving Harmony out of the bay and onto the port side of the Unity node. At 15:38 UTC, Harmony was officially mated to the space station. The station's new addition adds 2,666 cubic feet (75.5 m^{3}) to the station's living volume, an increase of almost 20%, from 15,000 cubic feet (420 m^{3}) to 17,666 cubic feet (500.2 m^{3}).

At the Mission Management Team meeting, managers cleared Discovery's heat shield for reentry, and verified that focused inspection was not required, but noted that late inspection will still be performed on flight day 13 following undocking. John Shannon mentioned that managers have decided to add a task to the second EVA, asking the astronauts to visually inspect the Solar Alpha Rotary Joint (SARJ) on the starboard side, as the joint has registered some vibration for the past month and a half. While the friction is not constant or severe, managers will have Tani remove the insulation covers from the joint to photograph the swing bolts on the joint since Tani would be near the area during the EVA.

=== October 27 (Flight day 5) ===
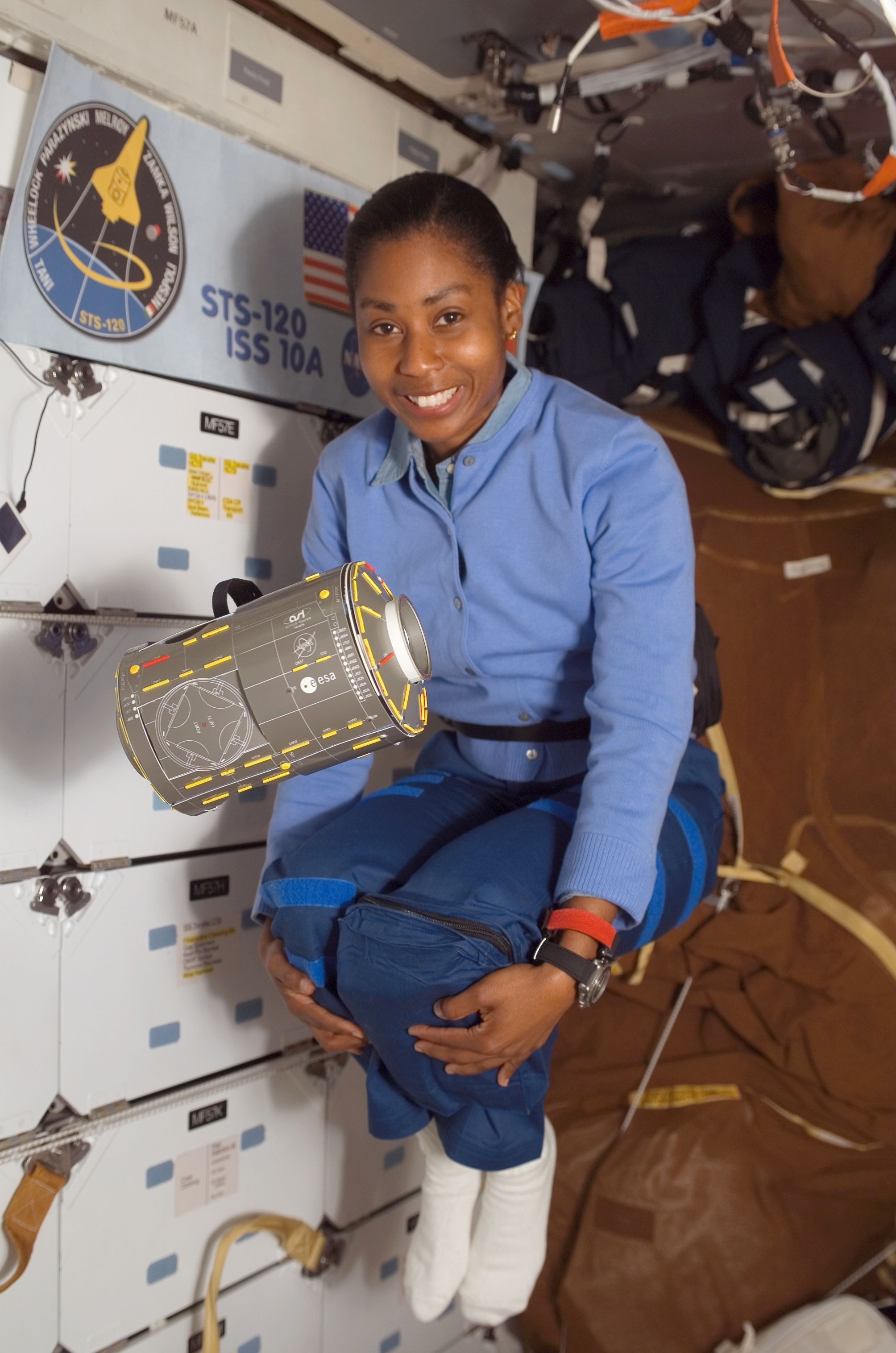
Stephanie Wilson floats with a model of Harmony on the middeck of Discovery.

The two crews worked to prepare Harmony for entry in the morning, connecting power and data cables, and at 12:24 UTC, the hatch was opened, and the crew was allowed to enter. Whitson, Malenchenko, and Nespoli entered first, wearing masks, and installed a temporary air duct to the node, to allow the air inside to circulate through the station's filters. Until the air is fully exchanged, occupancy of the node is limited to only a few crew members at a time, and they are not to remain inside for extended periods. Some of the work the crew has to do inside the node is to remove approximately 700 screws and bolts that are holding down equipment and panels, placed for security during launch, but not needed in space. After allowing the ventilation system work for several hours, the two crews participated in a press conference with CBS, Fox News, and WHAM-TV from inside Harmony.

=== October 28 (Flight day 6) ===
The two crews awoke at 05:08 UTC, and began preparing for the second EVA. Parazynski and Tani began the spacewalk at 09:32 UTC, a half-hour ahead of the planned timeline. The pair started with the P6 truss, removing the attachments to the Z1 truss, which allowed Wilson and Wheelock to use the station's robotic arm to move the truss to a position where it was "parked" for the night. Joking to Wilson "Don't drop it!", Parazynski then moved on and installed handrails onto Harmony, while Tani went to inspect some items requested by the managers, including handrails on a Crew and Equipment Translation Aid (CETA) cart, that was considered as a possible cause of Rick Mastracchio's glove tear on STS-118. Tani noted the handrail appeared to be intact, with no obvious sharp edges. Tani then moved on to the Solar Alpha Rotary Joint (SARJ) that has had an intermittent vibration for over a month. After removing the cover from the joint, Tani called down to the team to let them know he saw some metal shavings, and some wear patterns and discoloration on one of the rings inside the joint. "It's like the result that you get with the metal, iron filings and you put a magnet under it and they stand straight up." Tani collected some of the shavings onto some tape, which returned to Earth with the shuttle for further analysis. Managers decided to add a task to Tuesday's EVA, having Parazynski inspect the port (left side) SARJ, using photography and video to compare it to the starboard SARJ inspected by Tani.

=== October 29 (Flight day 7) ===
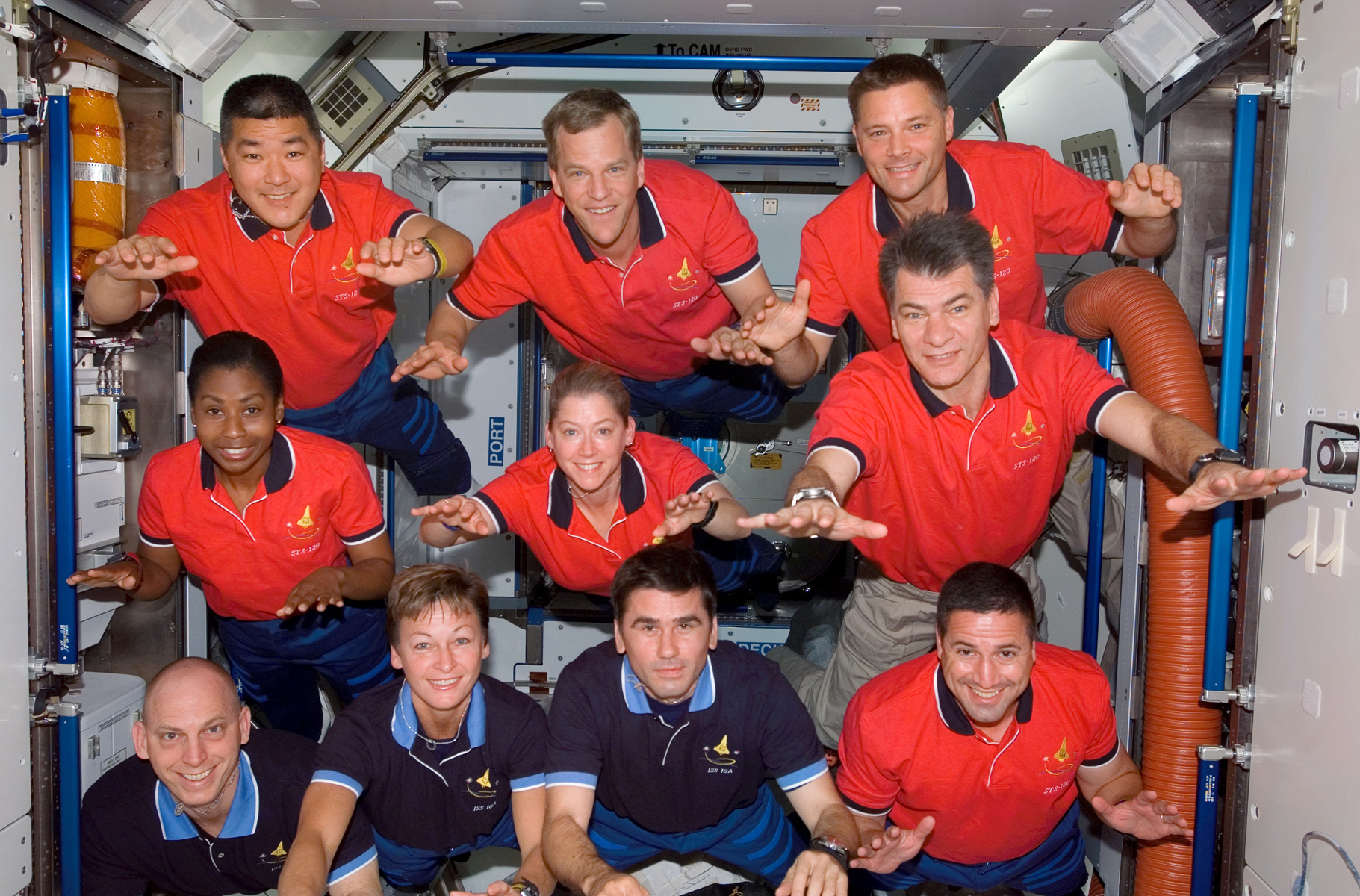
The two crews took time out to participate in a joint crew news conference, and to pose for a crew photo.

The two crews used the morning to move the P6 truss from its overnight position on the station's robotic arm, over to the shuttle's robotic arm. The crew then moved the station's arm along the mobile transporter to an outboard work site that allows attachment of the P6 truss to its new location on the P5 truss on Tuesday. Managers on the ground had Whitson perform an experiment on the shavings Tani collected from the SARJ on Sunday's EVA, putting a magnet under a slip of paper, and testing to see if the shavings collected on the paper, to ascertain if they were metal. The test confirmed the particles collected by Tani were ferrous. This information allowed the managers on the ground to rule out some possibilities of the origin of the particles, such as the thermal covers, which are made of aluminized mylar.

The Mission Management Team discussed the SARJ issues with the ISS team, and decided to add an extra docked day to the mission, between flight days 11 and 12. The new plan changed the objectives of EVA four from the heat shield repair materials testing, to a more thorough inspection of the starboard SARJ. With the new flight plan, Discovery would undock on November 5, 2007, with a landing on November 7, 2007, at approximately 05:11 EST.

=== October 30 (Flight day 8) ===
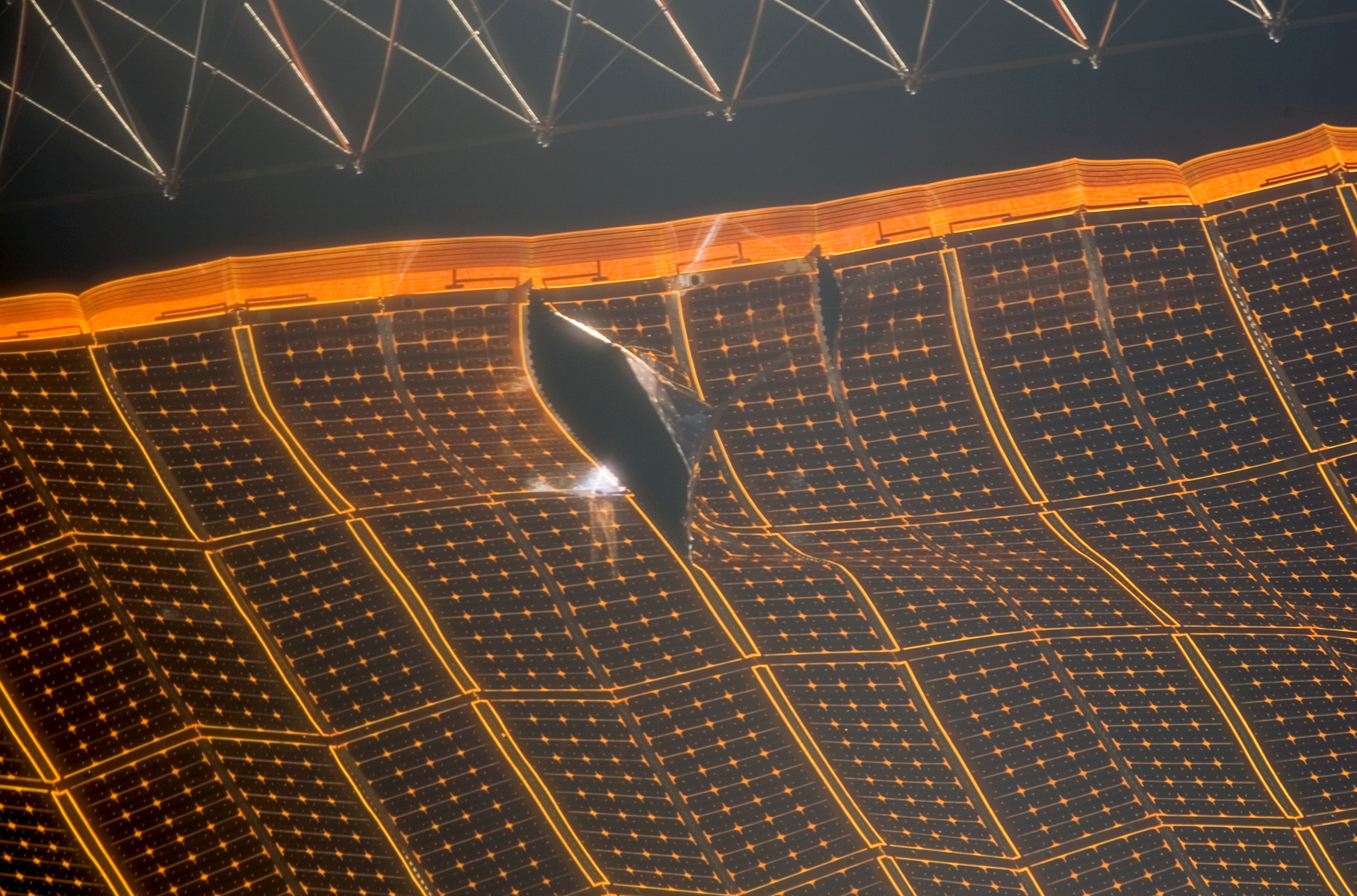
Image taken from a camera mounted on the space station, shows an apparent tear in the 4B solar array, with a smaller separation to the right.

The two crews spent the morning preparing for the mission's third EVA, which began at 08:45 UTC. The EVA completed the installation of the P6 solar arrays onto the P5 truss, and the rest of the EVA activities were accomplished successfully, with the EVA ending at 15:53 UTC. Once the P6 solar array was attached, the process of deploying the arrays began. The first set of arrays, 2B, was successfully deployed with no issues, but during the deployment of the 4B array, the crew halted when they noticed an abnormality. Initial images taken by the crew and station cameras showed what appeared to be a tear in a small portion of the array. During a press briefing, ISS Program Manager Mike Suffredini said the crew took high resolution images of the solar array, and the managers would analyze the images overnight to determine a course of action. Sufredini mentioned that with the array in the 90% unfurled position, it was still generating 97% of the expected power to the station, only slightly less than a fully unfurled array.

=== October 31 (Flight day 9) ===
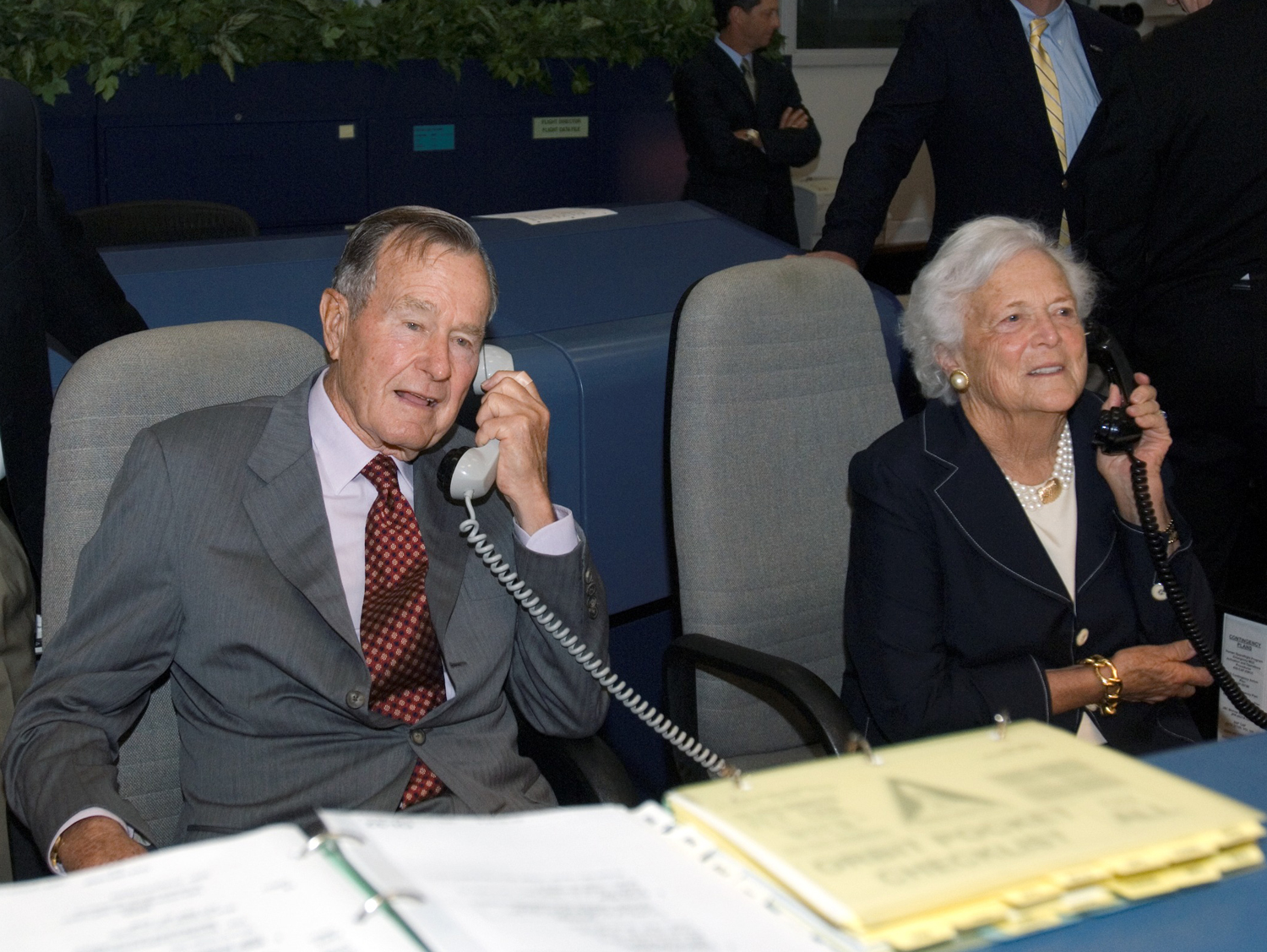
Former President George H. W. Bush and the former First Lady talk to the STS-120 astronauts and the Expedition 16 crewmembers during a visit to the Mission Control Center, at Johnson Space Center in Houston.

The crew began the day working through a variety of tasks, including preparing for the fourth EVA, installing a Zero Gravity Stowage Rack in Harmony, and working with some of the experiments on board. Nespoli and Melroy participated in a Public Affairs event (PAO), and received a call from the President of Italy, Giorgio Napolitano. The entire crew took part in a second PAO event, fielding calls from news agencies from the United States, Europe, and Russia. Around 15:00 UTC, mission control informed the crew that Thursday's planned EVA would be postponed to either Friday, or perhaps Saturday, to allow for a new EVA plan to be worked out, which would include troubleshooting of the P6 solar arrays.

=== November 1 (Flight day 10) ===
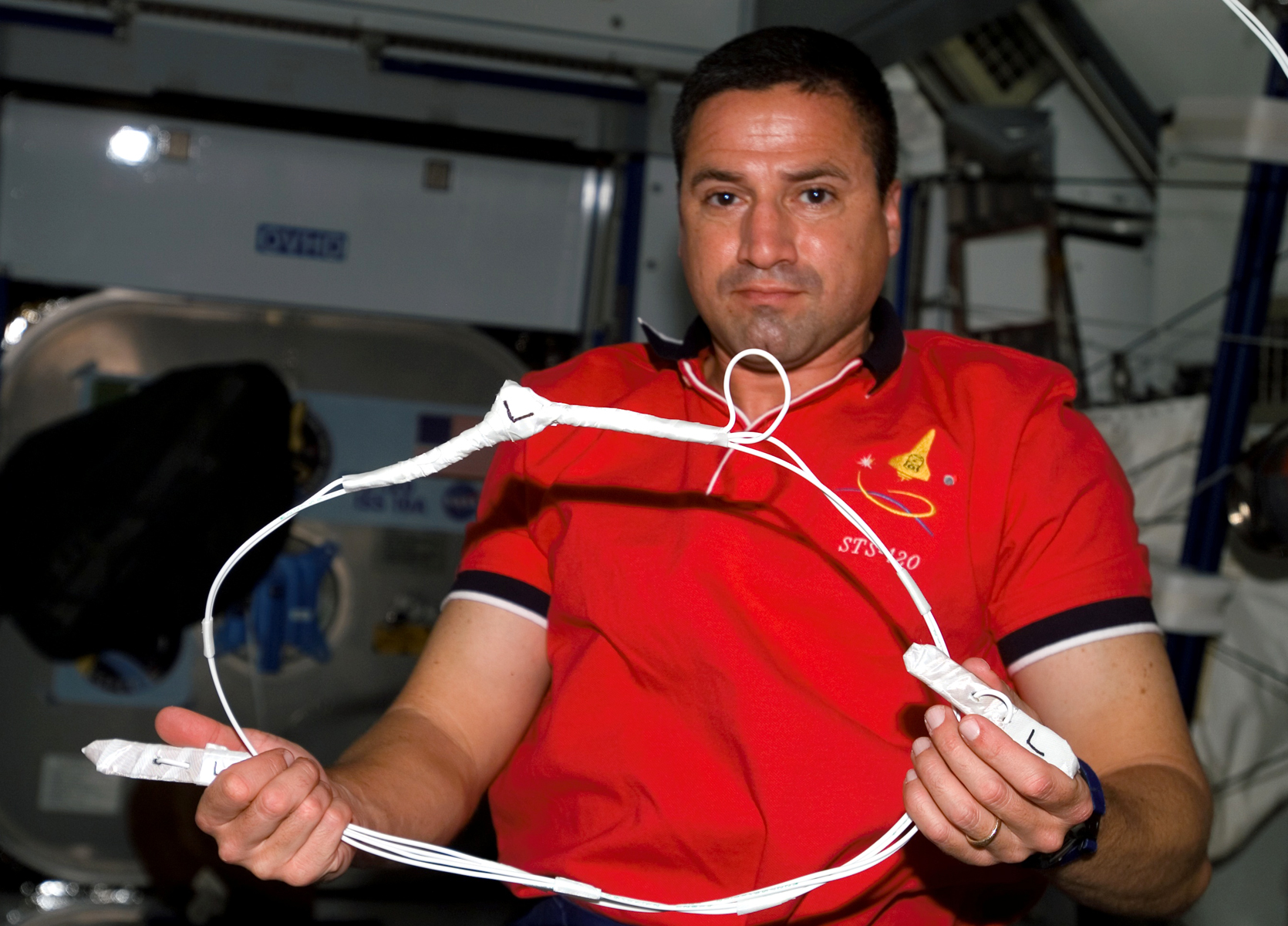
STS-120 pilot George Zamka holds a newly manufactured "cufflink" apparatus, one of five cufflinks assembled by crewmembers. The cufflink is designed to take the structural load off of the damaged hinges of the P6 4B solar array.

Shortly after awakening in the morning, the crew was informed that the managers had chosen to take an extra day to evaluate and plan the fourth EVA. Managers initially planned for the EVA to be done on flight day 11, but would use an extra day to conduct further analysis and allow the crew to have extra time to make the tools and equipment needed, and to review and practice the procedures. The crew took some time out to gather in the Harmony module to speak with former president George H. W. Bush and his wife, Barbara, who were visiting Johnson Space Center.

The rest of the day was devoted to assembling and configuring the new equipment and tools that would be required for the solar array repair, including a tool termed a "cufflink". The tear in the array is located at one of the hinges, which carries the load of the array, so the cufflink will be a load-bearing strap to relieve the pressure from the snagged area, transferring the load from the hinge, to the cufflink. The cufflink is made up of two wires, with two tabs at the end, that are threaded through existing reinforced aluminum holes in the solar array panels. The EVA plans call for the space station's robotic arm to grapple the shuttle's orbital inspection boom, with an extension on the end, to allow Parazynski to reach the solar array while positioned on a foot restraint at the end of the system. Wheelock will be watching to let the team know the clearances, and to assist Parazynski and the robotics team with positioning. With the changes to the timeline, the crew would be shifting their sleep schedule, to allow for a daylight landing on Wednesday, rather than the early morning landing that was originally planned. The fifth EVA that was planned for the Expedition 16 crew during the mission was delayed, and will be performed by the station crew after the shuttle departs.

=== November 2 (Flight day 11) ===
The shuttle and station crews spent the day discussing the new EVA plan with managers on the ground, reviewing the procedures, completing the tool configurations, and going over the timeline for the fourth EVA, scheduled for Saturday. The crew also positioned the station's mobile transporter and robotic arm on the end of the truss, to allow the apparatus to reach the solar array. Saturday's EVA would be the first operational use of the Orbiter Boom Sensor System (OBSS) to reach a worksite, although the task was tested and demonstrated during STS-121 to show the boom could provide a stable work platform for EVA activities.

=== November 3 (Flight day 12) ===
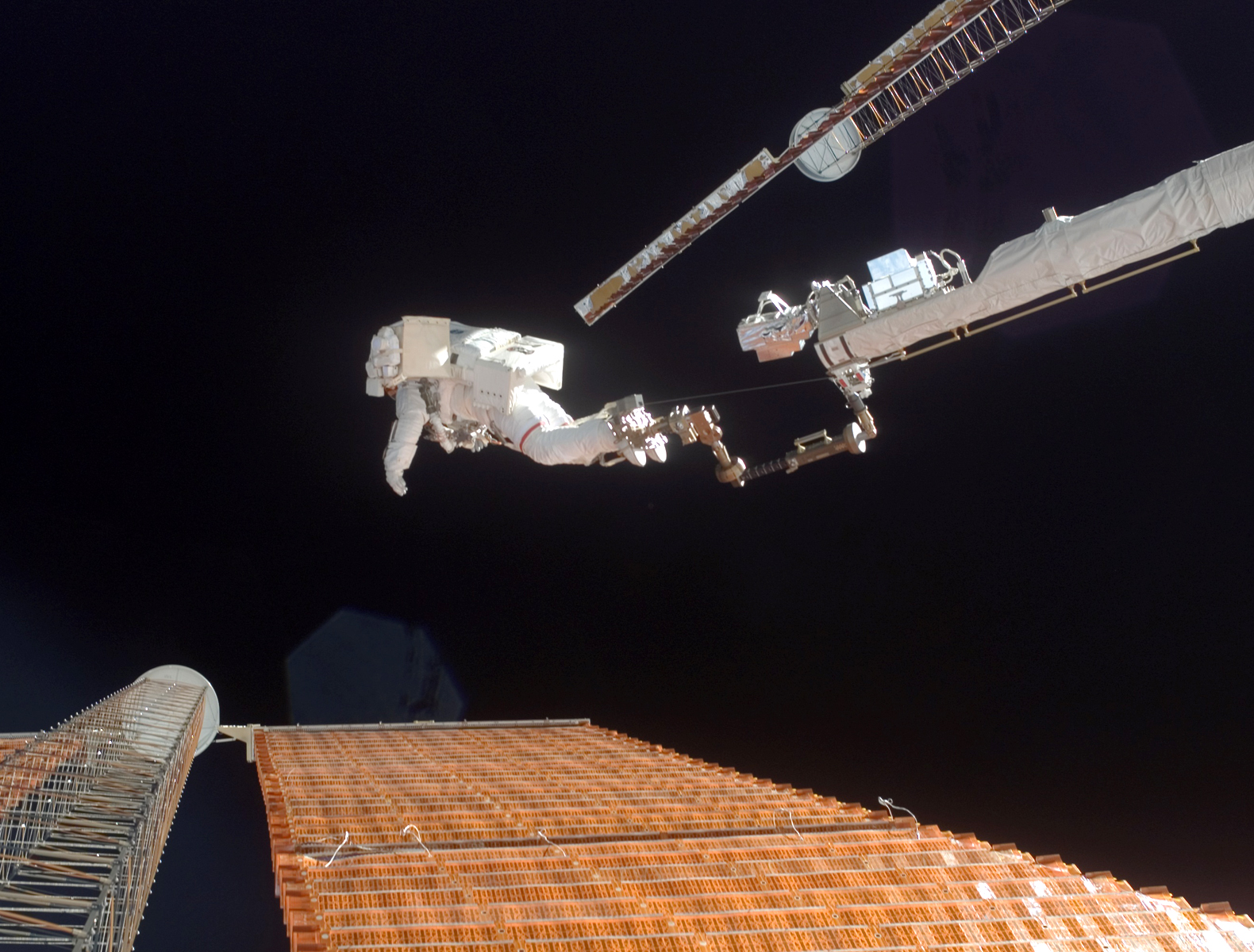
Astronaut Scott Parazynski at the end of the Orbiter Boom Sensor System performing the solar array repair.

After being awakened by the theme music from Star Wars, the station and shuttle crews got to work preparing for the mission's fourth EVA. The spacewalk began at 10:03 UTC. After translating out to the robotic arm, Parazynski attached himself to the adjustable portable foot restraint (APFR), and was taken to the solar array worksite. Working slowly, with direction from Wheelock and the ground team, Parazynski secured the five cufflinks to the array, and then backed away to observe the deploy action. Inside the station, the crew deployed the array a half a "bay" at a time, and the array was fully deployed at 15:23 UTC. After performing additional inspections of both the 2B, and 4B arrays, Parazynski and Wheelock finished the EVA at 17:22 UTC. With the mission's final spacewalk completed, Parazynski has completed seven EVAs, for a total time of 47 hours, 05 minutes, placing him 5th overall for total EVA duration. Wheelock completed three EVAs, for a total time of 20 hours, 41 minutes, and the total EVA time for STS-120 was 27 hours, 14 minutes. During the EVA, a pair of needlenose pliers floated free of the equipment, and was observed floating nearby the window by the crew inside the station. The tool floated clear of the station, and was not a hazard.

Illustration of plan	Repair images	
		OBSS used as an extension boom for Canadarm2.
		The placement of the five cufflinks designed to relieve tension from the damaged solar array hinge.

=== November 4 (Flight day 13) ===
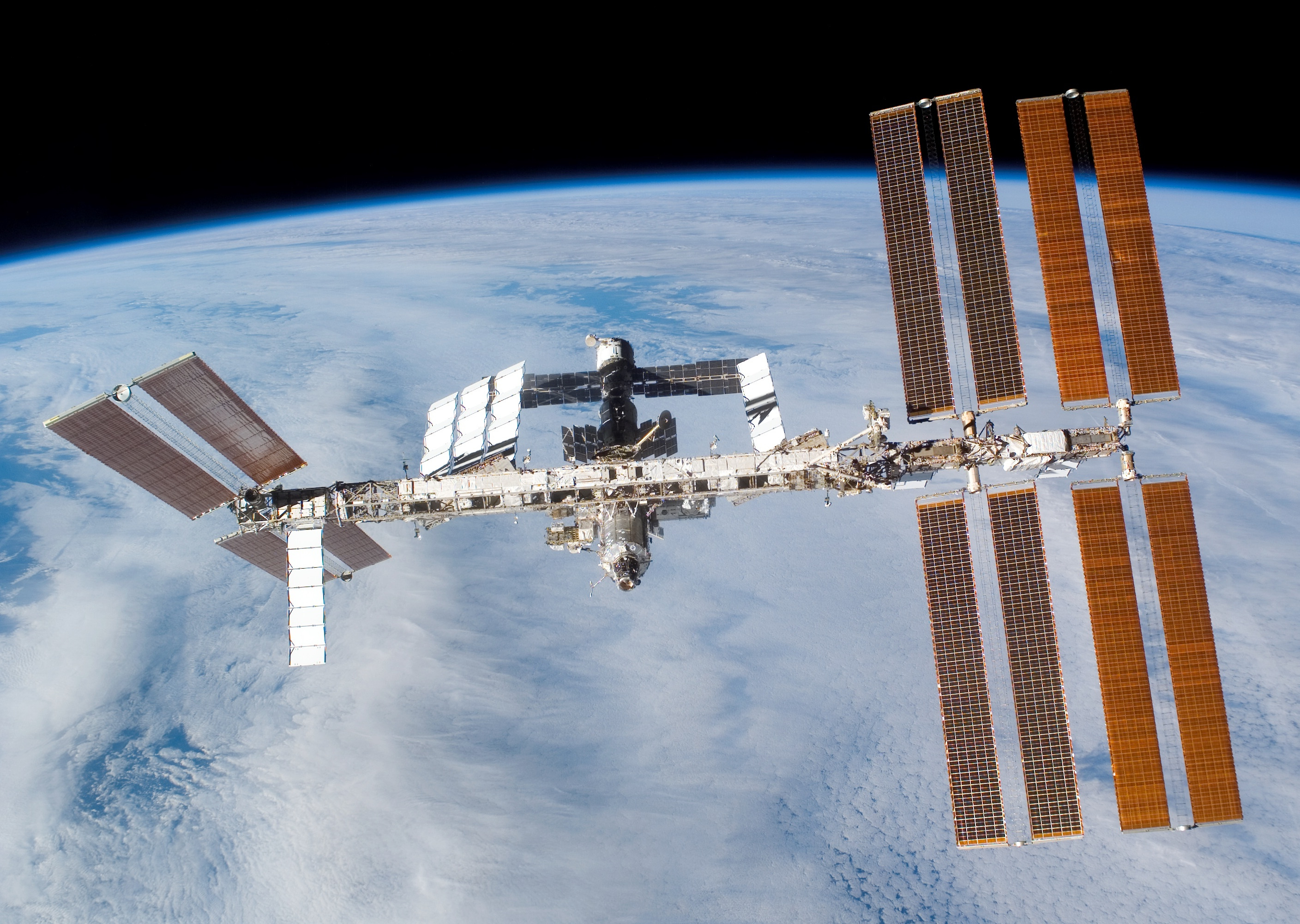
The International Space Station as seen following undocking. The P6 solar array is visible on the right.

The Shuttle and station crews spent the day transferring cargo, and resting in preparation for Monday's departure of Discovery. Nespoli and Melroy spent some time in the morning speaking to the Italian media, and later in the day the crew had some off-duty time. Following the traditional farewell ceremony, the hatches were closed at 20:03 UTC. During the emotional ceremony, Anderson spoke to the ground crew, expressing his gratitude for their support during his 137 days as an Expedition crewmember.

You all kept me safe, you've shown me unwavering patience and professionalism... And you've all overlooked my shortcomings, and it's my hope that maybe you've even had a few laughs along the way... What I'd like to say is: What we are doing here is very important for all of human kind. It's worth the risk, it's worth the cost, and you folks on the ground are the people who make it happen. So I want you to take pride in your work and constantly look toward the heavens, for it is there you will see your future. For all the flight control, training and engineering teams in Houston, Huntsville and Moscow... I say thank you, you are indeed the best and the brightest that our world has to offer.

— Clayton Anderson

=== November 5 (Flight day 14) ===
The two crews spent the morning preparing for Discovery's undocking from the International Space Station. At 10:32 UTC, the orbiter successfully backed away from the Pressurized Mating Adapter on the Destiny Laboratory, and pilot Zamka began the fly-around to allow the shuttle crew to photograph the new configuration of the station. After performing the final separation burn, focused inspection began, to scan the wing leading edges and nose cap, the final analysis that allows the ground team to clear the orbiter for re-entry on Wednesday.

=== November 6 (Flight day 15) ===
The crew of Discovery spent the day preparing Wednesday's landing. In addition to doing final packing and stowing activities, Melroy and Zamka did a check of the orbiter's systems, including the flight control systems, and the reaction control system jets. The crew took some time out in the morning to speak to the media, and then had a deorbit preparation briefing with the ground team. Melroy performed a burn of the orbiter's engines in the afternoon, an orbit adjustment burn done to refine the orbiter's trajectory for the two Wednesday landing opportunities at Kennedy Space Center. NASA managers officially cleared Discovery's heat shield for landing after reviewing the data sent down by the final inspection on Monday.

=== November 7 (Flight day 16, Landing) ===
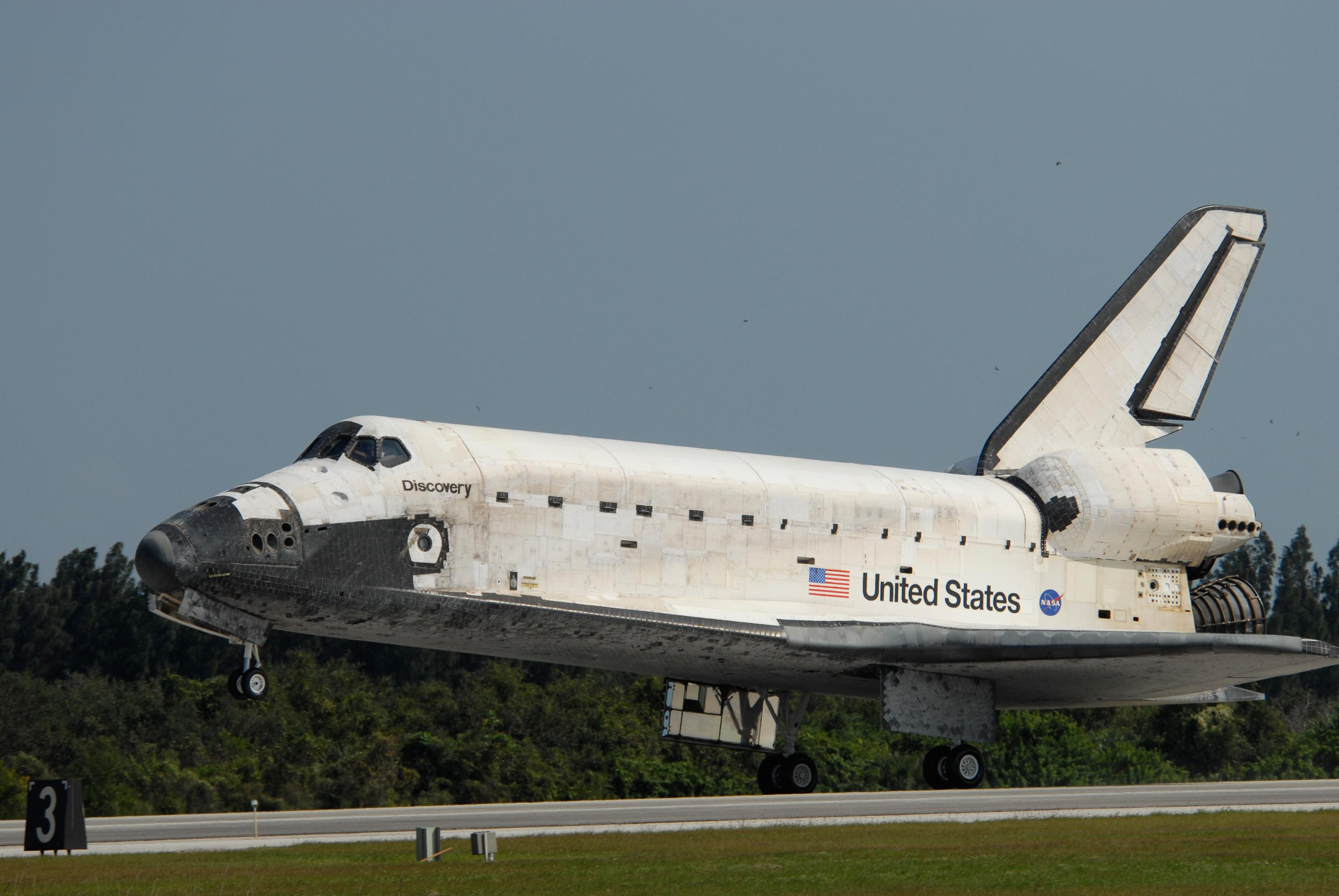
Discovery makes a smooth landing at the Shuttle Landing Facility, wrapping up a 15-day mission to deliver the Harmony module to the International Space Station.

The crew of Discovery got to work preparing for landing following their wake up call. NASA did not activate either Edwards Air Force Base, or White Sands, as the weather looked favorable for both landing opportunities at Kennedy. The weather forecast at the Shuttle Landing Facility called for good visibility, with mostly sunny skies, although the headwinds would be evaluated, as they had been peaking at 23 knots (43 km/h). Due to the sleep shifting done by the crew earlier in the mission to schedule the extra mission days, the landing was done on what is called a "descending" node entry. Unlike ascending node entries, this entry trajectory brought the shuttle diagonally across the United States for the first time since STS-107. The shuttle passed over Vancouver, British Columbia, Canada, and angled down towards Florida. Once the orbiter reached Florida, Melroy performed a 195-degree right overhead turn along the heading alignment cone (HAC) in order to line up for a landing on Runway 33. The first landing opportunity began with a deorbit burn at 16:59 UTC and finished with a landing at 13:01 EST. The deorbit burns were done to slow the orbiter's speed and to drop it out of freefall orbit and on target for the designated runway.

Discovery's payload bay doors were closed at 14:13 UTC, and the crew began fluid loading at 16:00 UTC. Fluid loading is a procedure that involves drinking high salt content fluids, which allows the astronauts to adjust to the return to gravity, and reduces the chance of hypotension upon returning to Earth. Shortly after 16:00 UTC, the crew began to get into their launch and entry suits, and ingress into their respective seats for landing. At 16:50 UTC, Entry Flight Director Bryan Lunney gave the crew the "go" for deorbit burn. The initiation of the burn committed Discovery to landing. The burn was initiated at 16:59 UTC, and was one minute and 53 seconds in duration. The deorbit burn is performed while the orbiter is facing opposite its direction of travel, which allows the engines to act as a braking system, slowing its speed by approximately 215 feet per second (66 m/s). After the burn, the remaining propellant in the orbiter's maneuvering thrusters was dumped overboard, at 17:13 UTC. Discovery began to feel the effects of gravity around 400,000 feet (120,000 m), as it traveled above the North Pacific Ocean at 17:30 UTC. As the orbiter descended, Melroy initiated a series of "rolls", and roll reversals, which serve to create friction and bleed off additional speed. At 17:40 UTC, Discovery entered the United States, flying over Montana. At 17:53, the orbiter entered Florida, flying at a speed of 3,500 mph (5,600 km/h), and an altitude of 118,000 feet (36,000 m).

Discovery touched down on runway 33 at 13:01:18 EST, the rear landing gear touching down first, the nose gear touching down at 13:01:32 EDT, and the orbiter came to a complete stop at 13:02:13 EDT. Total mission time was 15 days, 2 hours, 23 minutes, 55 seconds, for a distance of 6.25 million miles in 238 orbits. The completion of STS-120 marks the longest duration mission for Discovery.

== Extra-vehicular activity ==
Four spacewalks were scheduled and completed during STS-120. The cumulative time in extra-vehicular activity during the mission was 27 hours and 14 minutes.

EVA	Spacewalkers	Start (UTC)	End	Duration	Mission
EVA1	Scott E. Parazynski; Douglas H. Wheelock	October 26, 2007; 10:02 UTC	October 26, 2007; 16:16 UTC	6 hours, 14 minutes	Harmony (Node 2) installation preparation, S-Band Antenna Support Assembly (SASA) retrieval, P6/Z1 fluid line disconnections, P6 aft radiator shroud installations.
EVA2	Scott E. Parazynski; Daniel M. Tani	October 28, 2007; 09:32 UTC	October 28, 2007; 16:05 UTC	6 hours, 33 minutes	Z1 to P6 umbilical disconnections, P6 detach from Z1, S1 radiator configuration, Node 2 handrail installations, S4 starboard Solar Alpha Rotary Joint (SARJ) inspection.
EVA3	Scott E. Parazynski; Douglas H. Wheelock	October 30, 2007; 08:45 UTC	October 30, 2007; 15:53 UTC	7 hours, 08 minutes	P6 to P5 attachment. P6/P5 umbilical connections, S1 configure post-redeploy, port SARJ inspection.
EVA4	Scott E. Parazynski; Douglas H. Wheelock	November 3, 2007; 10:03 UTC	November 3, 2007; 17:22 UTC	7 hours, 19 minutes	Inspection and repair of P6 Solar Array.

== ESA Esperia Mission ==
Italian astronaut Paolo Nespoli participated in the European Space Agency's (ESA) Esperia mission as part of his involvement in the STS-120 Space Shuttle flight to the International Space Station (ISS) in October 2007.

The Esperia mission was a scientific program coordinated by ESA and the Italian Space Agency (ASI), with the objective of conducting a suite of biomedical and biological experiments in microgravity. According to the official STS-120 press kit, Nespoli served as a flight engineer aboard Expedition 16 and was responsible for executing five scientific experiments provided by the European science community.

Two of the experiments – Chromosome‐2 and Neocytolysis – were sponsored by ESA. These aimed to investigate changes in gene expression and red blood cell destruction under microgravity conditions, respectively. The remaining three – HPA, FRTL‐5, and SPORE – were supported by ASI.

- HPA (Human Pathways Alteration) studied alterations in protein expression due to spaceflight.
- FRTL‐5 involved cultured thyroid cells to observe cellular behavior in microgravity.
- SPORE (Spore Test) evaluated the survival and mutation rates of fungal spores in space.

The scientific results contributed to the understanding of human adaptation and biological responses to the space environment, with potential applications in both space exploration and terrestrial medicine.

== Wake-up calls ==
NASA began a tradition of playing music to astronauts during the Gemini program, which was first used to wake up a flight crew during Apollo 15. Each track is specially chosen, often by their families, and usually has a special meaning to an individual member of the crew, or is applicable to their daily activities.

Flight Day	Song	Artist/Composer	Played for	Links
Day 2	"Lord of the Dance"	John Langstaff	Pamela Melroy	wav mp3 Transcript
Day 3	"Dancing in the Moonlight"	King Harvest	Dan Tani	wav mp3 Transcript
Day 4	"Rocket Man"	Elton John	Douglas Wheelock	wav mp3 Transcript
Day 5	"Bellissime stelle"	Andrea Bocelli	Paolo Nespoli	wav mp3 Transcript
Day 6	"What a Wonderful World"	Louis Armstrong	Scott Parazynski	wav mp3 Transcript
Day 7	"One by One"	Wynton Marsalis	Stephanie Wilson	wav mp3 Transcript
Day 8	"Malagueña Salerosa"	Chingon	George Zamka	wav mp3 Transcript
Day 9	"Nel blu dipinto di blu"	Domenico Modugno	Paolo Nespoli	wav mp3 Transcript
Day 10	"The Lion Sleeps Tonight"	Robert John	Pamela Melroy	wav mp3 Transcript
Day 11	"World"	Five for Fighting	Doug Wheelock	wav mp3 Transcript
Day 12	Star Wars	John Williams	Scott Parazynski	wav mp3 Transcript
Day 13	"The Presence of the Lord Is Here"	Byron Cage	Stephanie Wilson	wav mp3 Transcript
Day 14	"Roll Me Away"	Bob Seger	George Zamka	wav mp3 Transcript
Day 15	"Space Truckin'"	Deep Purple	Clayton Anderson	wav mp3 Transcript
Day 16	"Chitty Chitty Bang Bang"	Sherman Brothers	Pamela Melroy	wav mp3 Transcript

== Contingency mission ==
STS-320 was the designation given to the Contingency Shuttle Crew Support mission which would have been launched in the event Space Shuttle Discovery became disabled during STS-120. It would have been a modified version of the STS-122 mission, which would have involved the launch date being brought forward. If it had been needed, it would have been launched no later than January 5, 2008. The crew for this mission would have been a four-person subset of the full STS-122 crew.

== Media ==
Space Shuttle Discovery launches from launch pad 39A at Kennedy Space Center as part of the STS-120 mission

== See also ==
- 2007 in spaceflight
- List of human spaceflights
- List of International Space Station spacewalks
- List of Space Shuttle missions
- Lists of spacewalks and moonwalks
