= George D. Zamka =

American astronaut (born 1962)

George Zamka
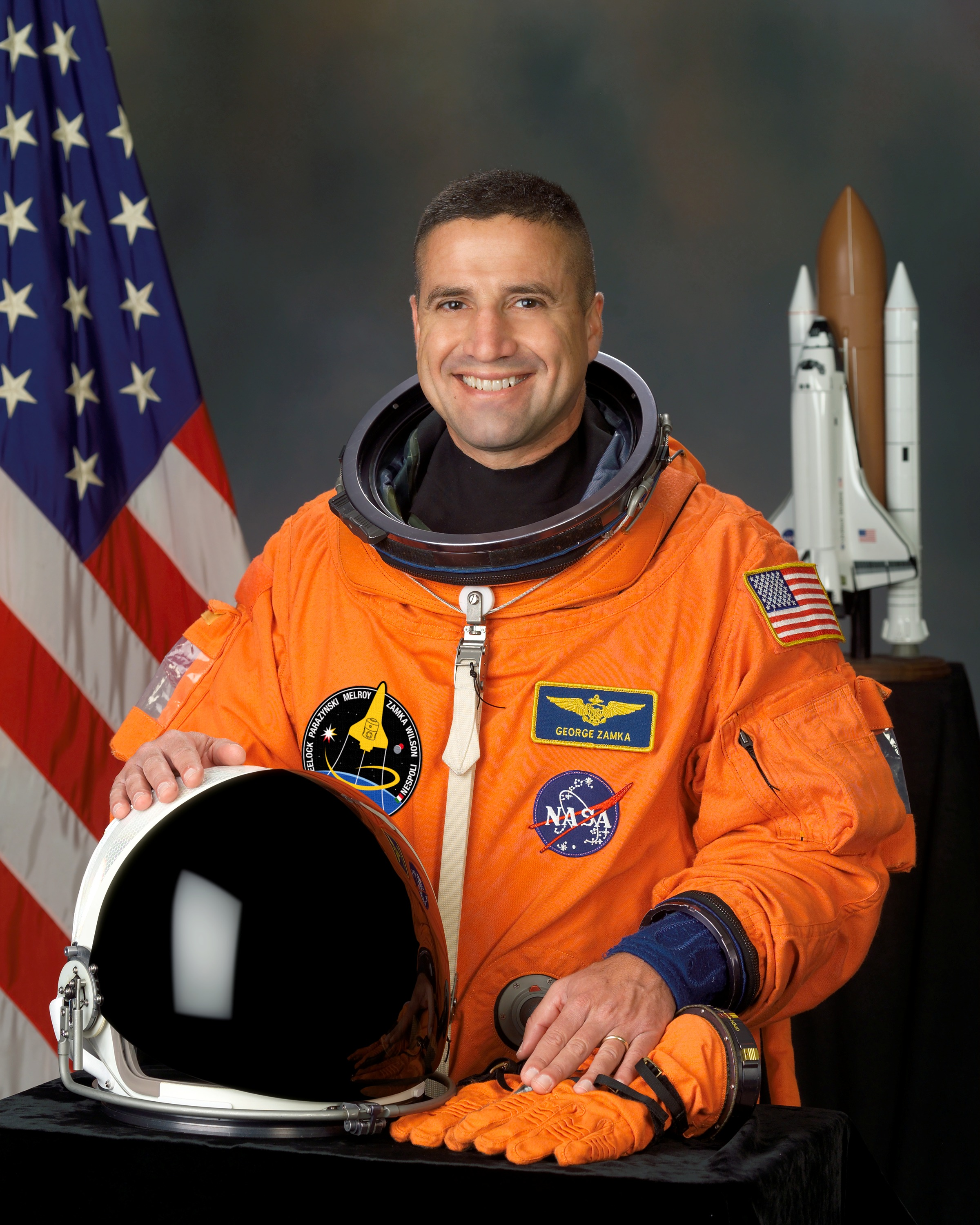
- Born: George David Zamka; June 29, 1962 (age 64); Jersey City, New Jersey, U.S.
- Other name: Zambo
- Education: United States Naval Academy (BS)
- Space career

NASA astronaut
- Rank: Colonel, USMC
- Time in space: 28d 20h 32m
- Selection: NASA Group 17 (1998)
- Mission: STS-120; STS-130
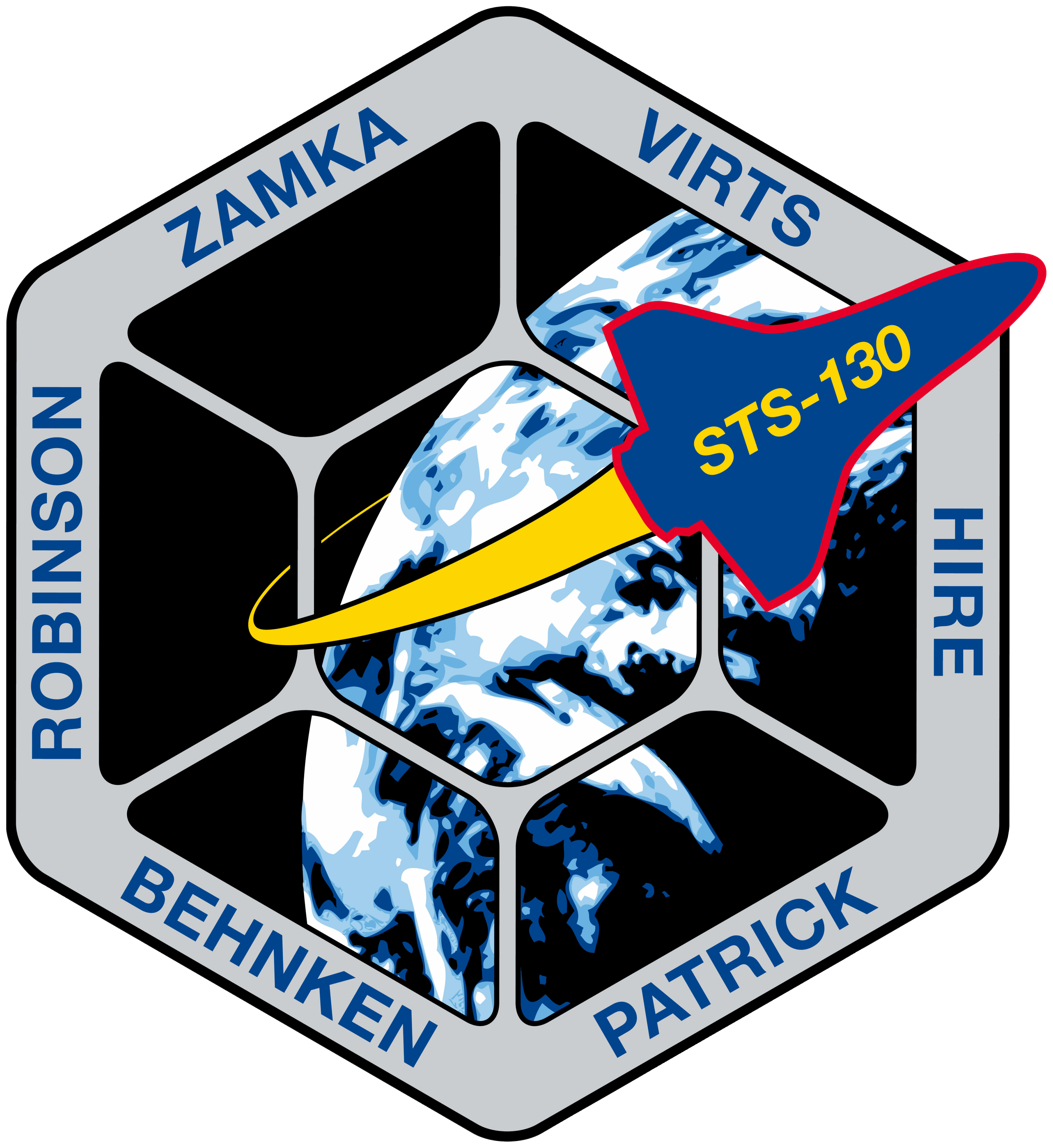
- Mission insignia

George David "Zambo" Zamka (born June 29, 1962) is a former NASA astronaut and United States Marine Corps pilot with over 3500 flight hours in more than 30 different aircraft. Zamka piloted the Space Shuttle Discovery in its October 2007 mission to the International Space Station and served as the commander of mission STS-130 in February 2010.

== Personal ==
George David Zamka was born on June 29, 1962, at Margaret Hague Hospital in Jersey City, New Jersey. He was raised in New York City; Irvington, New York; Medellín, Colombia; and Rochester Hills, Michigan. He graduated from Rochester Adams High School in Michigan in 1980. His personal hobbies include weightlifting, running, bicycling, scuba diving, and boating.

Zamka is married and has two children. His extended family resides in Colorado, Mississippi, Georgia, Indiana, Florida and Tennessee. Zamka is of Colombian and Polish ancestry.

== Military career ==
Zamka graduated with a Bachelor of Science degree in mathematics from the United States Naval Academy in 1984. He was then commissioned as a second lieutenant in the United States Marine Corps. He received A-6E Intruder training at Naval Air Station Whidbey Island, Washington in 1985–1987. He was assigned to VMA(AW)-242 at Marine Corps Air Station El Toro, California. In addition to flight safety and administration, he was a squadron weapons and tactics instructor. In 1990, he trained as an F/A-18D Hornet pilot and was then assigned to VMFA(AW)-121. Zamka flew 66 combat missions during Operation Desert Storm. In 1993, he was assigned to the 1st Battalion, 5th Marines at Marine Corps Base Camp Pendleton, California as a forward air controller. In December 1994, he graduated from the U.S. Air Force Test Pilot School, following which, he served as an F/A-18 Hornet test pilot and operations officer.

In 1997, he earned a Masters of Science degree in engineering management from the Florida Institute of Technology. In 1998, he returned to VMFA(AW)-121 and deployed to MCAS Iwakuni, Japan.

In August 2010, Zamka retired from the Marine Corps after almost 30 years of distinguished service. During his time as a pilot for the Marine Corps, Zamka logged more than 5,000 flight hours spanning 30 different aircraft. As of May 2018 he is chairman of the board of the National Association of Spaceports.

== NASA career ==
In June 1998, Zamka was selected for the NASA astronaut program, and reported for training in August. He served as lead for the Shuttle training and procedures division and as supervisor for the astronaut candidate class of 2004. Zamka made his first spaceflight as the pilot of mission STS-120, and second as the commander for STS-130. In March 2013, Zamka decided to retire from NASA. In the two shuttle missions Zamka completed, he logged more than 692 hours in space and travelled 12 million miles.

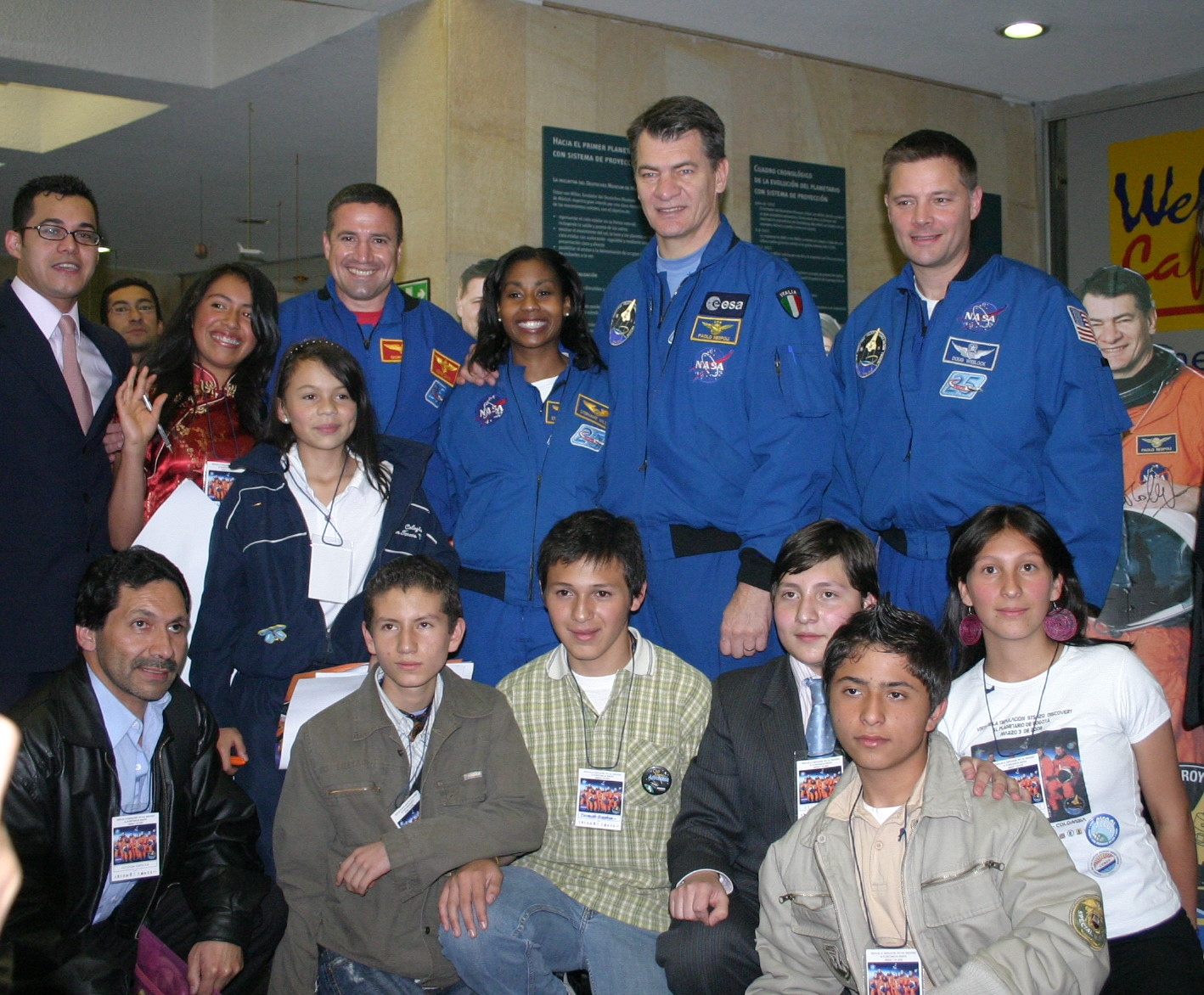
Zamka at the Planetarium of Bogotá

== Honors and awards ==
Zamka has received the following honors and awards: the Legion of Merit, Distinguished Flying Cross, Defense Meritorious Service Medal, Meritorious Service Medal, Navy Strike Air Medal (6), Navy Commendation Medal with Combat "V", and various other military service and campaign awards. Distinguished Graduate, U.S. Naval Academy. Commodore's list and Academic Achievement Award, Training Air Wing Five. Recipient of the NASA Outstanding Leadership Medal, two NASA Space Flight Medals, four NASA Superior Accomplishment Awards and the GEM Award. He received also Officer's Cross of the Order of Merit of the Republic of Poland (2010).

== Promotional activities ==
In March 2008, Zamka visited Colombia's Planetarium of Bogotá with the crew of mission STS-120 to share their experience as NASA astronauts with 200 students, 50 teachers, and 20 science major experts.

== See also ==
- Hispanics in the United States Marine Corps
- Hispanics in the United States Naval Academy
- List of Hispanic astronauts
