= William Oefelein =

American astronaut (born 1965)

Bill Oefelein
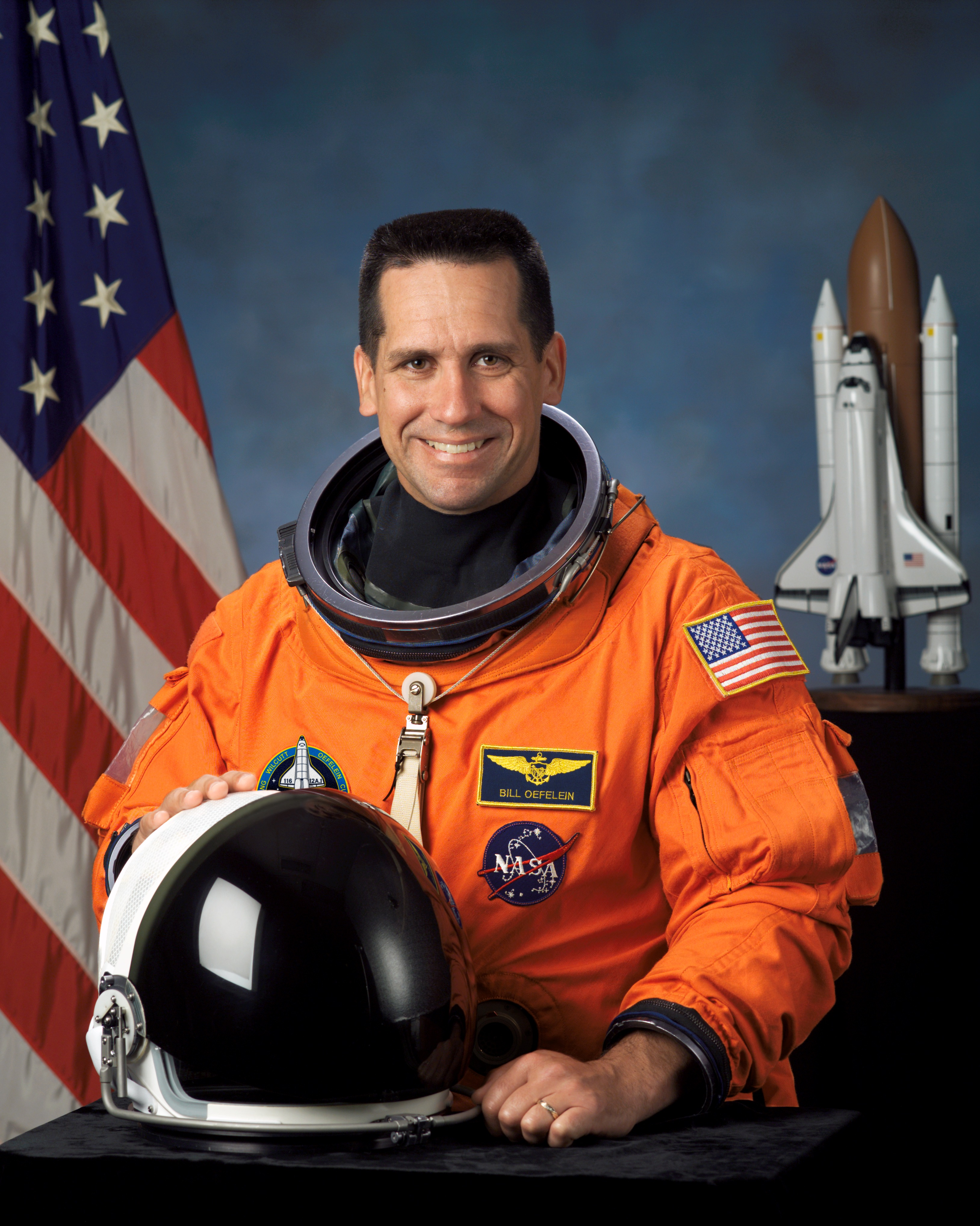
- Oefelein in 2003
- Born: William Anthony Oefelein; March 29, 1965 (age 61); Fort Belvoir, Virginia, U.S.
- Education: Oregon State University (BS); University of Tennessee Space Institute (MS)
- Space career

NASA astronaut
- Rank: Commander, USN
- Time in space: 12d 20h 45m
- Selection: NASA Group 17 (1998)
- Mission: STS-116
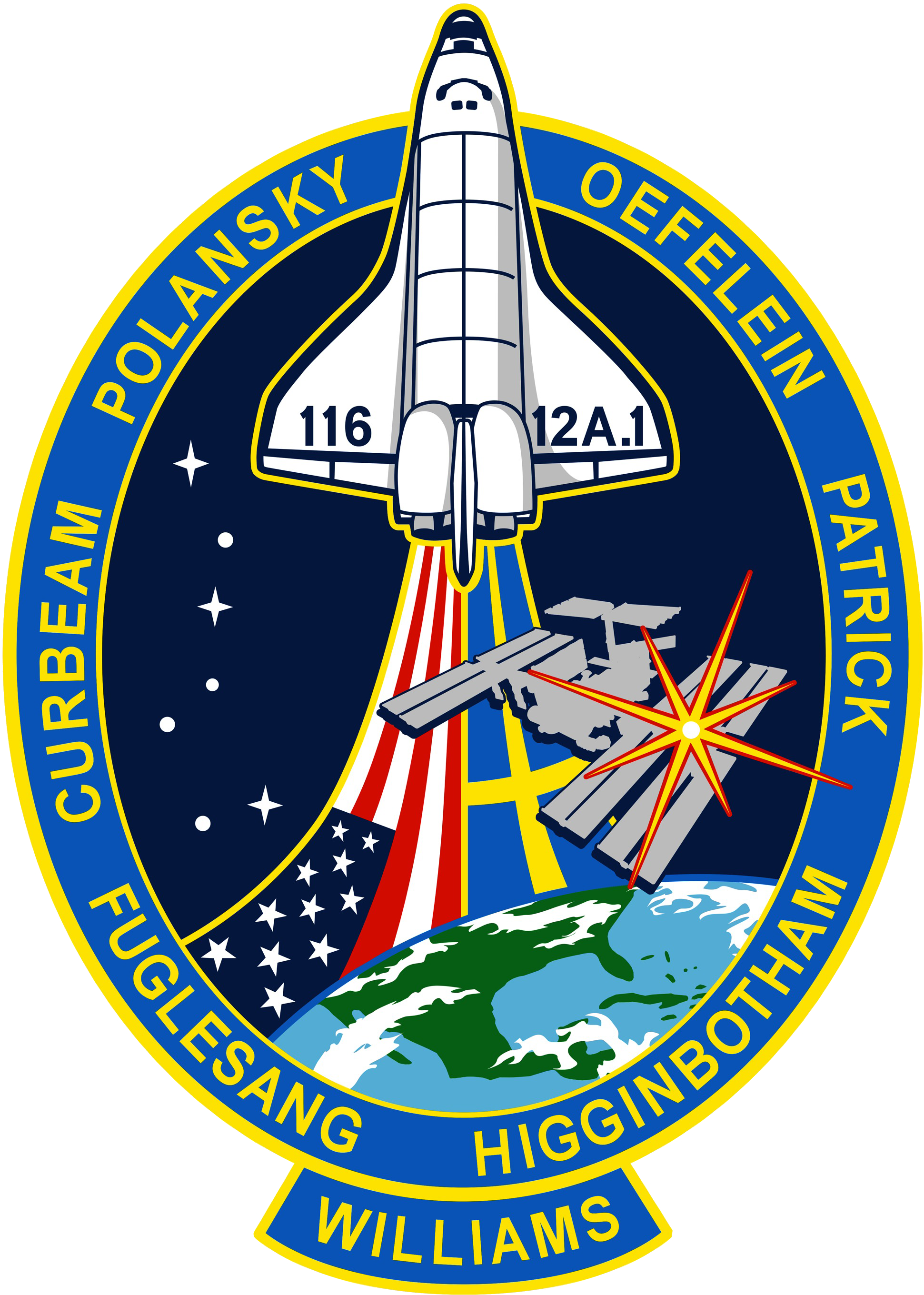
- Mission insignia

William Anthony Oefelein (/ˈoʊfɛlaɪn/; born March 29, 1965) is an American freelance adventure writer and photographer and former NASA astronaut who, on his only spaceflight, piloted the STS-116 Space Shuttle mission.

Oefelein gained media attention on February 5, 2007, when fellow astronaut Lisa Nowak was arrested in Florida and charged with attempting to kidnap his girlfriend, U.S. Air Force Captain Colleen Shipman. Nowak later pleaded guilty to felony burglary and misdemeanor battery. Oefelein admitted to a two-year affair with Nowak, and he and Nowak became the first astronauts ever dismissed from NASA. Following the dismissals, NASA created its first astronaut Code of Conduct.

== Early life and education ==
Oefelein was born on March 29, 1965, in Fort Belvoir, Virginia, and grew up in Anchorage, Alaska, where he flew floatplanes, and graduated from West Anchorage High School in 1983. He earned his Bachelor of Science degree in electrical engineering from Oregon State University in 1988, where he became a member of Sigma Alpha Epsilon. Ten years later he received a Master of Science degree in aviation systems from the University of Tennessee Space Institute.

== Career ==
In 1988, Oefelein received his commission as an ensign in the United States Navy from Naval Aviation Officer Candidate School in Pensacola, Florida. He entered flight training in Texas in 1989 and was designated a Naval Aviator in September 1990. His early assignments included overseas deployments to the Persian Gulf as a strike fighter pilot in the F/A-18 Hornet. After attending the United States Navy Strike Fighter Tactics Instructor program (a.k.a. TOPGUN), Oefelein graduated in 1995 from the U.S. Naval Test Pilot School at NAS Patuxent River, Maryland, where he later served as an instructor. In 1998, he was working as a strike operations officer for Carrier Air Wing Eight at NAS Oceana, Virginia.

In June 1998, Oefelein was selected by the NASA Astronaut Corps to be an Astronaut Candidate in NASA Astronaut Group 17. After two years of training and evaluation, he was promoted to Astronaut, receiving his Astronaut Pin, with qualification for the NASA position of Space Shuttle pilot. He was initially assigned technical duties in the Astronaut Office Advanced Vehicles Branch and Capsule Communicator (CAPCOM Branch. Oefelein's only mission was piloting Space Shuttle Discovery on STS-116, which launched on December 9, 2006, logging over 308 hours in space before landing on December 22.

Five months after completing his only space mission, and three months after his married former girlfriend, fellow astronaut Lisa Nowak, attacked his current girlfriend Colleen Shipman, NASA terminated Oefelein's service with the space agency on May 23, 2007, stating that NASA and the U.S. Navy had made "a mutual decision" that his service with the NASA Astronaut Corps was no longer required, and that he would be reassigned to the U.S. Navy. Oefelein and Nowak were the first astronauts ever dismissed by NASA, which created a written Code of Conduct for the NASA Astronaut Corps following their termination. Oefelein retired from the Navy in the fall of 2008, returning to Alaska to start a business called Adventure Write as a freelance writer and photographer with Shipman, then his fiancée and current wife.

=== Spaceflight experience ===
Oefelein served as pilot for the STS-116 mission aboard Space Shuttle Discovery from December 9 to 22, 2006. The seven-member crew on this 12-day mission continued construction of the International Space Station by adding the P5 spacer truss segment during the first of four spacewalks. The next two spacewalks rewired the station's power system, preparing it to support the addition of European and Japanese science modules by future Shuttle crews. The fourth spacewalk was added to allow the crew to coax and retract a stubborn solar panel to fold up accordion-style into its box. Discovery also delivered a new crew member and more than two tons of equipment and supplies to the station. Almost two tons of items no longer needed on the station returned to Earth with STS-116.

== Personal life ==
Oefelein was married to his first wife and had not yet been accepted to the NASA Astronaut Corps when he met married and recently selected Astronaut Candidate Lisa Nowak in 1996. When Oefelein became an astronaut candidate in 1998, he and Nowak became romantically involved while training together at NASA. Oefelein and his first wife, who had two children together, divorced in 2005. Oefelein continued his relationship with the still married Nowak, while also starting a relationship, in November 2006, with U.S. Air Force Captain Colleen Shipman. Shipman and Oefelein exchanged racy emails throughout his December 2006 space mission, and he ended his relationship with Nowak in January 2007. On February 5, 2007, Nowak was arrested at the Orlando International Airport following an assault on Shipman. On November 10, 2009, Nowak pleaded guilty to charges and was sentenced to time served plus one year's probation.

On July 10, 2009, Oefelein and Shipman were living together in Alaska when they announced their engagement. The couple married in summer 2010, and live in Wasilla, Alaska, with their son, born in 2012. Shipman is now an author under the pen name C.M. McCoy, and released her first novel in December 2015.

In September 2011, Oefelein survived a small plane crash in rural Alaska.
