= Atmospheric Neutral Density Experiment =

Space experiment satellite

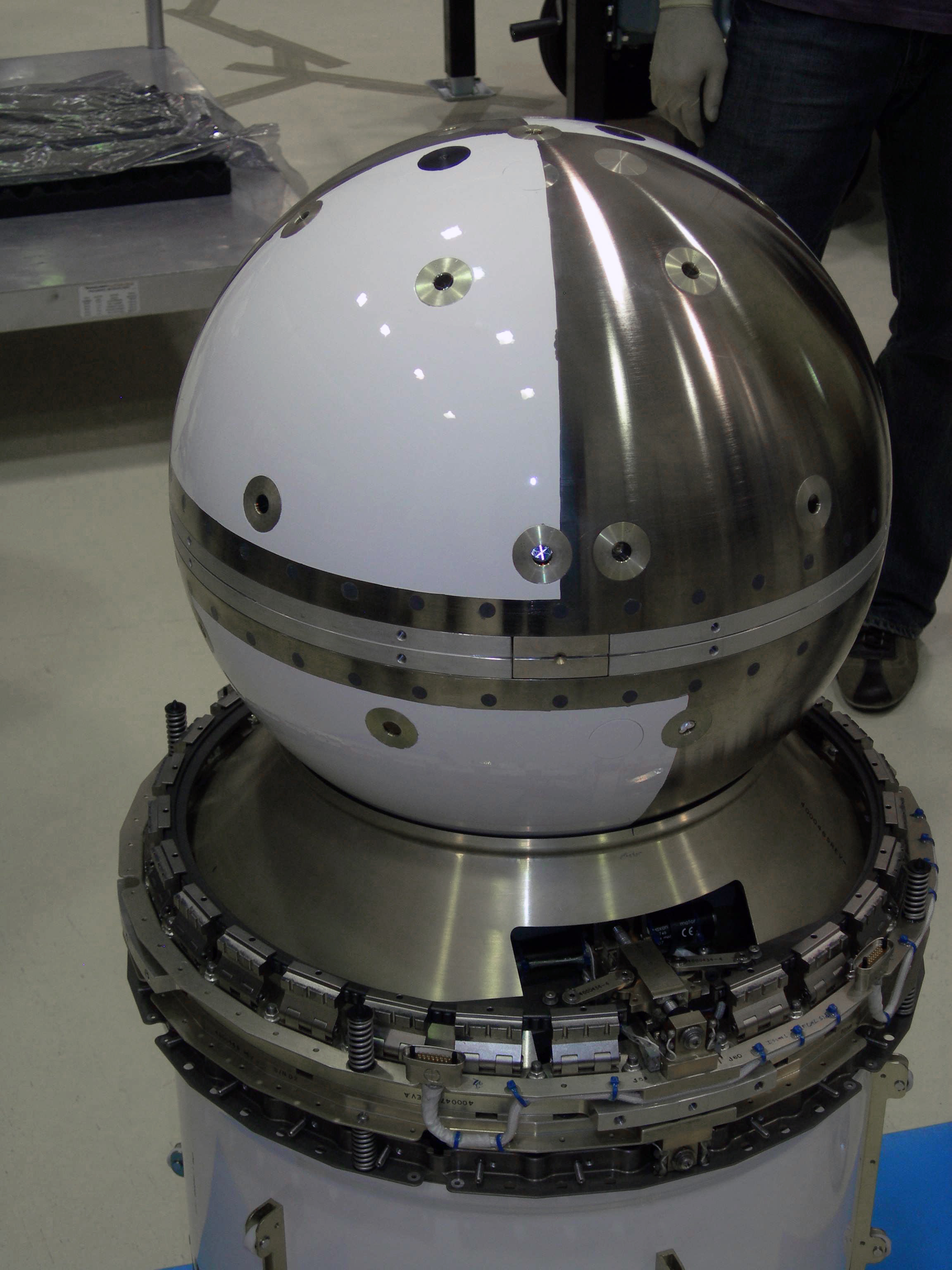
- OSCAR 62 satellite.
- Mission type: Technology
- Operator: U.S. Naval Academy
- COSPAR ID: 2006-055J
- SATCAT no.: 29667

Spacecraft properties
- Launch mass: 75 kg (165 lb)

Start of mission
- Launch date: 21 December 2006, 01:47 UTC
- Rocket: Space Shuttle Discovery
- Launch site: Kennedy LC-39B
- Contractor: NASA

End of mission
- Decay date: 25 May 2008

Orbital parameters
- Reference system: Geocentric
- Regime: Low Earth
- Perigee altitude: 228 km (142 mi)
- Apogee altitude: 254 km (158 mi)
- Inclination: 51.6°
- Period: 89.3 minutes
- Epoch: 10 December 2006

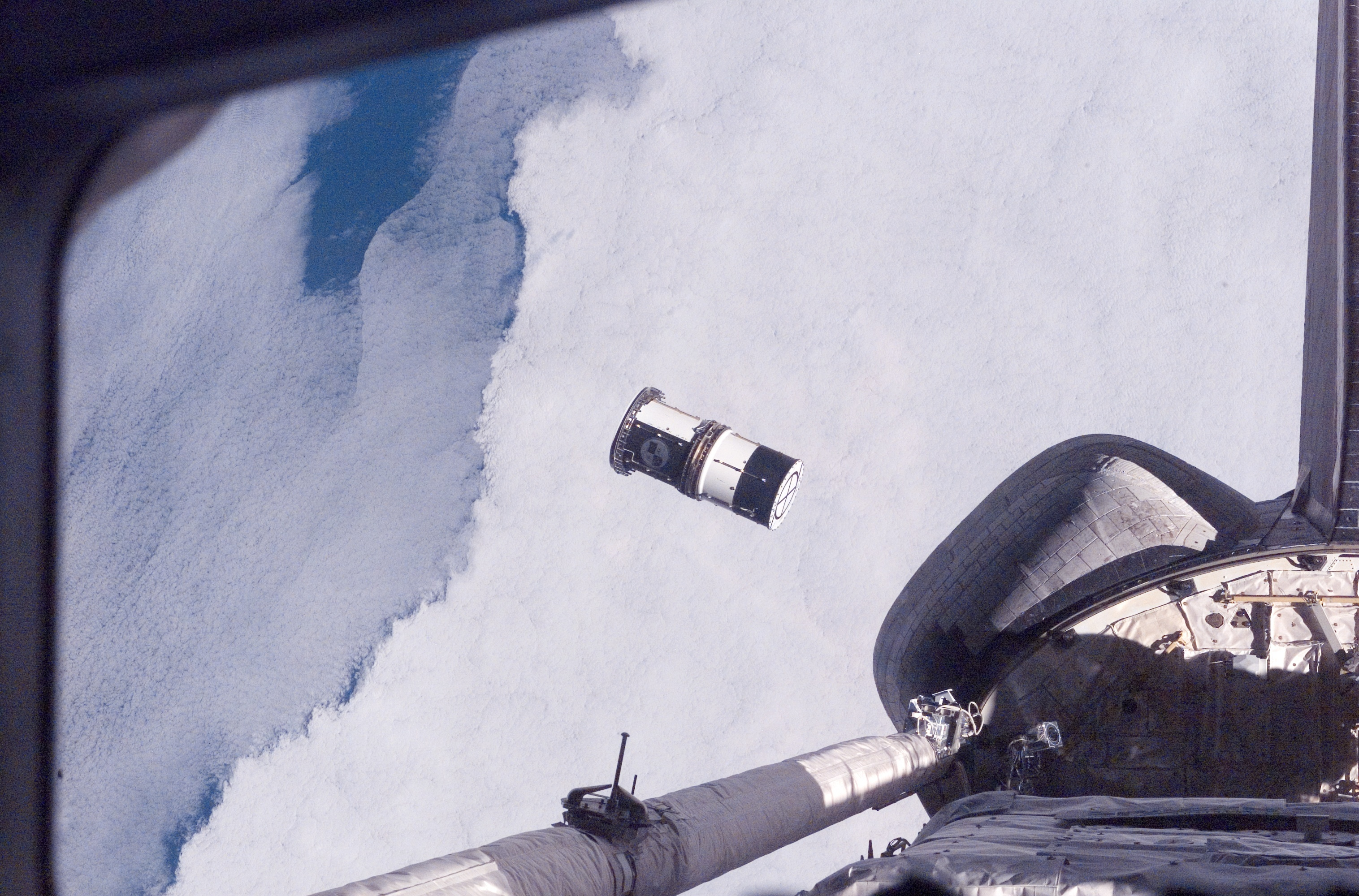
As seen through windows on the aft flight deck of Space Shuttle Discovery, the ANDE picosatellite is released from the shuttle's payload bay by STS-116 crewmembers.

The Atmospheric Neutral Density Experiment (ANDE) is an experiment using two spherical satellites to measure the effects of atmospheric drag on spacecraft. ANDE is part of the Space Test Program of the United States Department of Defense, and was deployed in September 2006 from the Space Shuttle Discovery.

== Satellites ==
The two spacecraft used for the ANDE mission are the Mock ANDE Active (MAA) sphere (Navy-OSCAR 61) and the Fence Calibration (FCAL) sphere (OSCAR 62). These microsatellites, developed by the Naval Research Laboratory, will measure drag through the use of precision orbit determination. Ground-based lasers will be used to track the orbits of the sphere to with a couple centimeters of accuracy. Perturbations caused by density gradients and winds will be backed out from these measurements. The two ANDE satellites are nearly perfect spheres; this was done to make the drag on the satellites independent of their orientation, and because the drag coefficient, optical cross-sections, and radar cross sections of spheres are well understood.

Each spherical micro satellite was constructed using the novel technique of centrifugal casting. This manufacturing technique was advantageous due to its low cost and its ability to achieve the high tolerances necessary to make the sphere as round and smooth as possible.

The ANDE MAA sphere is made from a proprietary alloy of AL 6061 that is castable, while the FCAL sphere is made from brass. The ANDE FCAL sphere has the distinction of being the only micro satellite to have its structure composed primarily of brass. The differences in materials and hence density and mass of the spheres will cause them to separate from each other along track over time. This separation will be measured and compared to predicted models of where the satellite should be based on computed models of the space environment.

== Uses ==
Beside their use in the in-situ determination of upper atmospheric density these satellites also function as technology demonstrators and as amateur radio digipeaters. Each satellite can be accessed via amateur radio using the APRS protocol. Part of the technology demonstration was the integration of a command and telemetry system that would not require the use of normal antennas that would destroy the spherical shape of the micro satellites. The MAA sphere communicates by electrically isolating its two hemispheres with an insulating center disk. The FCAL sphere actually does deploy four whip antennas but each antenna is only a few thousandths of an inch in diameter.

Power is provided to these microsatellites using lithium inorganic primary cells – another technology demonstrator. The MAA also has photovoltaic cells made from copper indium gallium selenide (CIGS) deposited on a stainless steel substrate which is used for coarse sun sensing and is another technology demonstrator. The FCAL sphere uses standard photodiodes.

ANDE was deployed from the Space Shuttle Discovery on December 21, 2006, near the end of the STS-116 ISS servicing mission.

The ANDE-FCAL satellite deployed and is functioning, however the ANDE-MAA failed to deploy at the same time as the FCAL sphere after it became stuck in its launch canister.

The deployment of these spheres was another technology demonstrator for the newly developed Canister for All Payload Ejections (CAPE) system. One of the difficulties encountered and solved with this technology was the ability to restrain and deploy microsatellites that did not have any type of standard attachment points.

== See also ==
- Balloon satellite, e.g., Echo 2
- BLITS
- MIMOSA
- STS-116
- STARSHINE
- Vanguard 1
