= Nicholas Patrick =

British-American astronaut and engineer (born 1964)

Nick Patrick
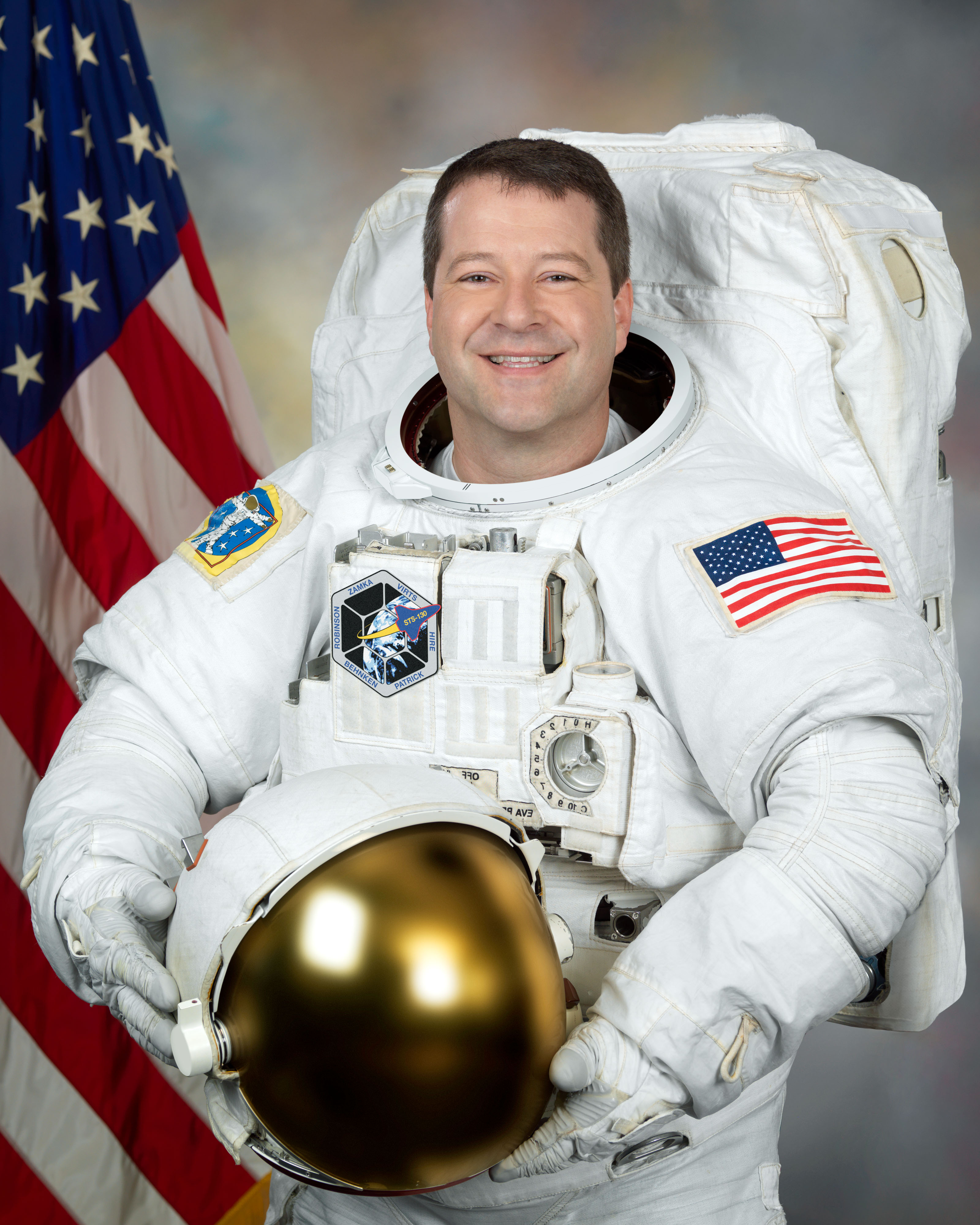
- Born: Nicholas James MacDonald Patrick; 19 November 1964 (age 61); Saltburn-by-the-Sea, England, UK
- Education: Trinity College, Cambridge (BS); Massachusetts Institute of Technology (MS, PhD)
- Space career

NASA astronaut
- Time in space: 26d 14h 52m
- Selection: NASA Group 17 (1998)
- Total EVAs: 3
- Total EVA time: 18h, 14m
- Missions: STS-116; STS-130
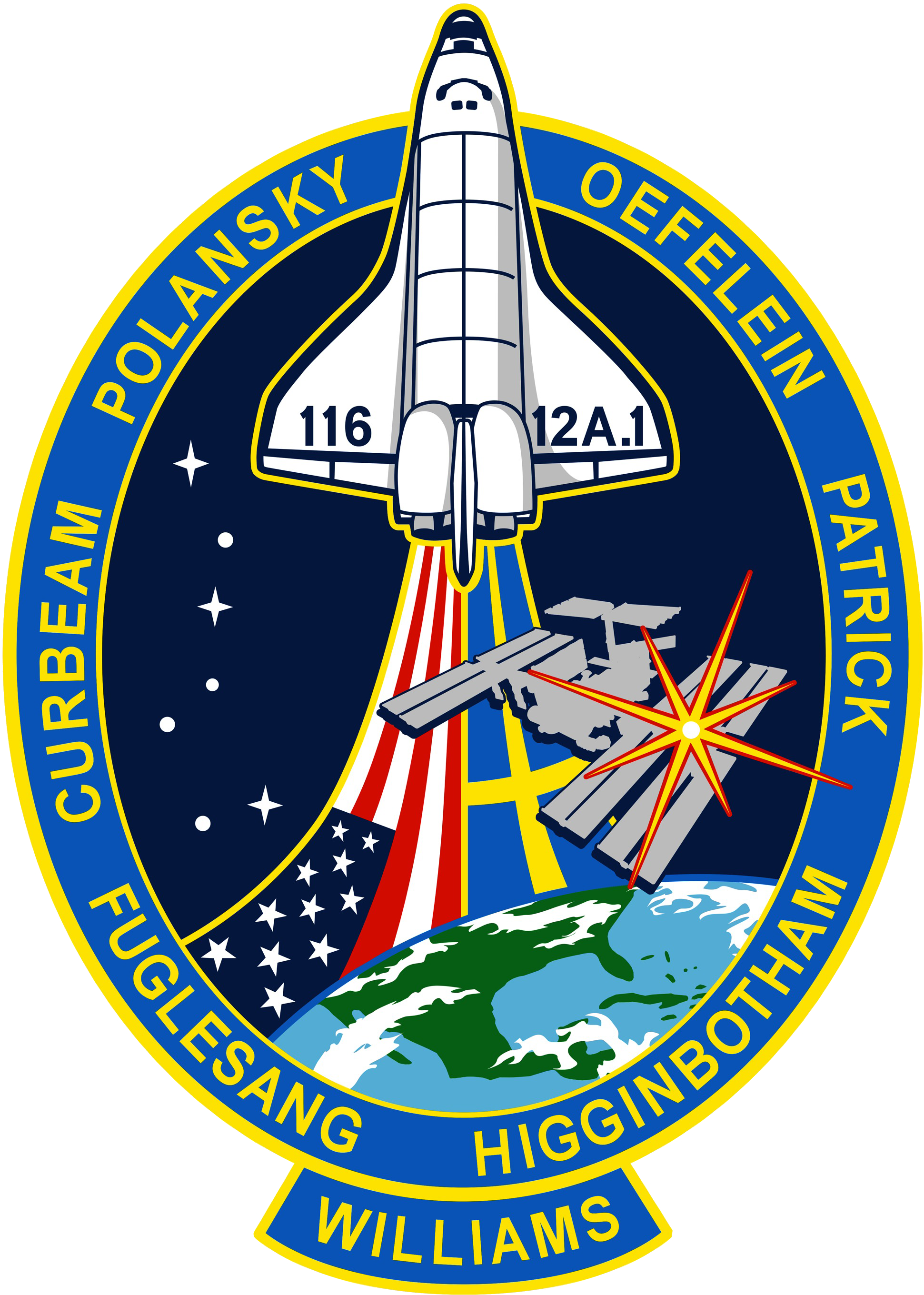
- Mission insignia
- Scientific career
- Fields: Mechanical engineering
- Thesis: Decision-Aiding and Optimization for Vertical Navigation of Long-Haul Aircraft (1996)
- Doctoral advisor: Thomas B. Sheridan

Nicholas James MacDonald Patrick (born 19 November 1964), is a British-American engineer and a former NASA astronaut. His flight on the 2006 Discovery STS-116 mission made him the fourth person born in the United Kingdom to go into space.

== Personal life ==
Patrick was born in Saltburn-by-the-Sea in the North Riding of Yorkshire, England, in 1964 to Gillian and Stewart Patrick. His mother came from the Isle of Skye in Scotland. He grew up in both London and Rye, New York, and became a United States citizen in 1994. Patrick is married to a paediatrician originally from Peru and has three children.

== Education and early career ==
Patrick was first educated at Harrow School and Trinity College, Cambridge (receiving an undergraduate degree in Engineering in 1986). During his university years, he learned to fly as a member of the Royal Air Force's Cambridge University Air Squadron. After Cambridge, he worked for four years as an engineer for the Aircraft Engines Division of General Electric, in Lynn, Massachusetts in the United States.

Patrick then attended the Massachusetts Institute of Technology, receiving a master's degree (1990) and a PhD. (1996), both in Mechanical Engineering. Afterwards, he joined Boeing's Commercial Airplane Group in Seattle.

== Space career ==
=== NASA career ===
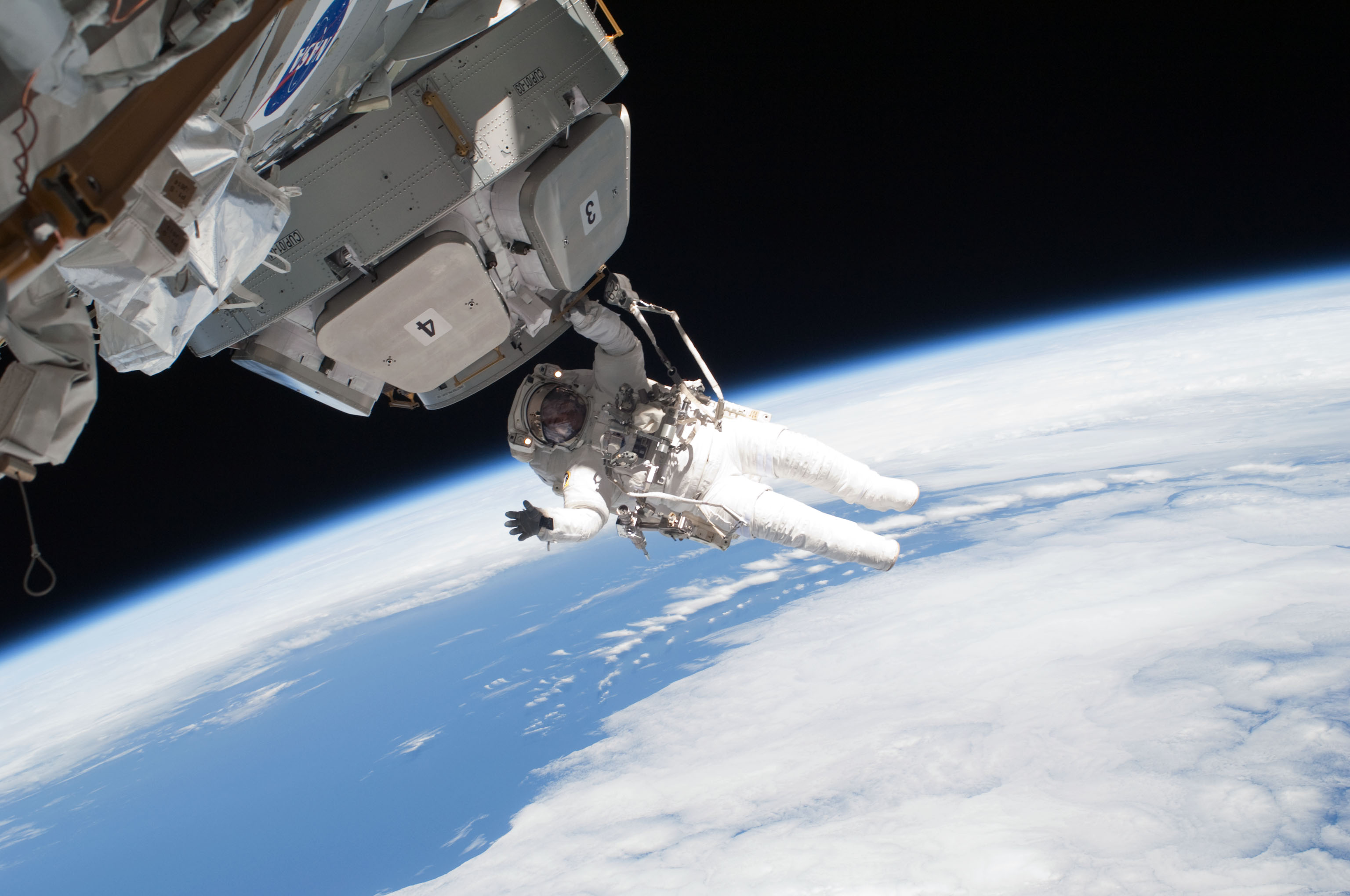
Nicholas Patrick on STS-130 is pictured outside the Cupola

Patrick was selected by NASA as an astronaut candidate in June 1998 and reported to NASA's Johnson Space Center (JSC) for astronaut training in August 1998. His initial training included scientific and technical briefings, intensive instruction in Shuttle and International Space Station systems, and physiological, survival, and classroom training in preparation for T-38 flight.

Patrick has logged over 308 hours in space, having completed his first space mission as a member of the crew of STS-116 – a construction and logistics mission to the International Space Station. He occasionally serves as a CAPCOM; for example, he worked with the Orbit 2 team for STS-120.

Patrick notably put the finishing touches on the Tranquility node during STS-130.

In July 2004, Patrick served as an aquanaut during the NEEMO 6 mission aboard the Aquarius underwater laboratory, living and working underwater for ten days. In August 2007, he served as the commander of the NEEMO 13 mission, living underwater for another ten days.

Patrick retired from the NASA Astronaut Corps in May 2012.

==== NASA spaceflight experience ====
STS-116 Discovery (9–22 December 2006): The seven-member crew on this 12-day mission continued construction of the ISS outpost by adding the P5 spacer truss segment during the first of four spacewalks. The next two spacewalks rewired the station's power system, preparing it to support the addition of European and Japanese science modules by future shuttle crews. The fourth spacewalk was added to allow the crew to coax and retract a stubborn solar panel to fold up accordion-style into its box. Discovery also delivered a new crew member and more than two tons of equipment and supplies to the station. Almost two tons of items no longer needed on the station returned to Earth with STS-116. Mission duration was 12 days, 20 hours and 45 minutes.

Owing to both his Scottish ancestry and involvement in the Careers Scotland Space School, Patrick took with him on Discovery a Scottish flag that had been flown at the Scottish Parliament. It is now kept on display at the National Museum of Scotland in Edinburgh.

STS-130 Endeavour (8 to 21 February 2010): This mission launched at night, carrying the International Space Station's final permanent modules: Tranquility and Cupola. Tranquility (or Node 3) is now the life-support hub of the station, containing exercise, water recycling, and environmental control systems, while the Cupola provides the largest set of windows ever to grace a spacecraft. These seven windows, arranged in a hemisphere, provide a spectacular and panoramic view of Earth and a direct view of station robotic operations. During the 13-day, 18-hour mission, Endeavour and her six-member crew traveled more than 5.7 million miles and completed 217 orbits of the Earth, touching down at night at Kennedy Space Center, Florida.

=== Blue Origin career ===
Patrick joined Blue Origin in 2012. He currently holds the positions of New Shepard Flight Director and Senior Director of Human Integration at Blue Origin.
