= Careers Scotland Space School =

Organization

The Careers Scotland Space School, also known as the Scottish Space School, is an organisation set up by Careers Scotland and funded by the Scottish Government. This is a government programme, organised as a partnership initiative with NASA (National Aeronautics and Space Administration), to encourage young people to gain an interest in STEM subjects, Science, Technology, Engineering and Maths.

== The Initiatives ==
The programme provides support teaching materials and includes provision for 120 pupils to attend a summer school, which focuses on electronics and life sciences, at the University of Strathclyde. There is also a series of visits to schools by NASA astronauts and scientists. For example, in June 2007 staff from NASA attended an exhibition in Nairn. In 2007 it is using a staged competition-like structure, with the top prize (for 52 students) a 12-day trip to Johnson Space Center, in Houston, Texas.

== Endorsing the Programme ==
In March 2007, Nick Patrick, to show his support for the Space School, returned to Edinburgh, carrying a saltire flag that had been with him on his first NASA space mission, with a student who was participating in the Space School.

The Scotsman described the initiative as "a world-leading programme". Alex Blackwood, the programme founder, won the 2006 Achievement in Education Sir Arthur Clarke Award. A regular invited presenter at the school is the Cyborg scientist Kevin Warwick.
