= STS-116 =

2006 American crewed spaceflight to the ISS

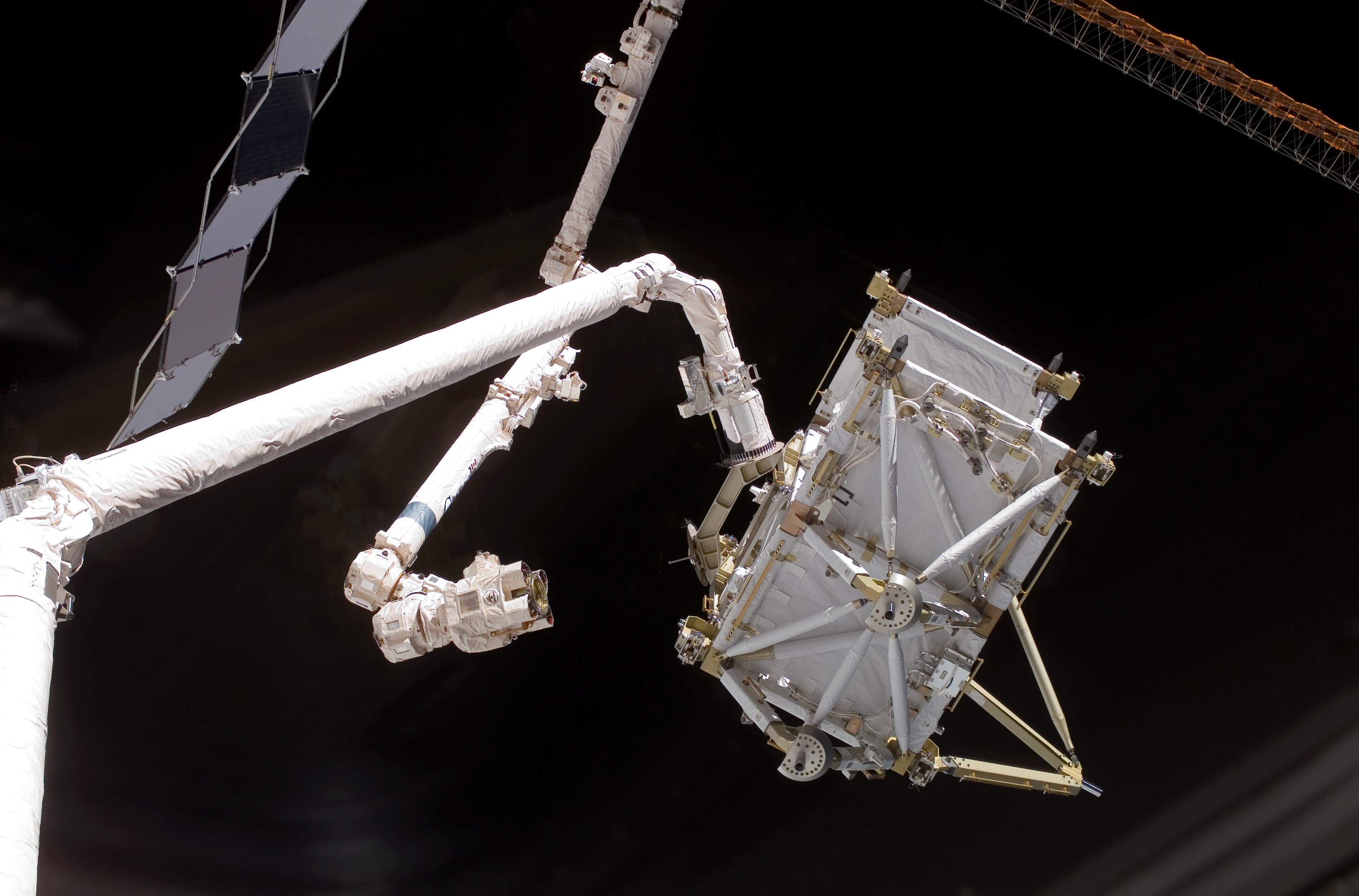
- Discovery's Canadarm hands the P5 truss segment to Canadarm2, prior to its installation on the ISS.
- Names: Space Transportation System-116
- Mission type: ISS assembly
- Operator: NASA
- COSPAR ID: 2006-055A
- SATCAT no.: 29647
- Mission duration: 12 days, 20 hours, 44 minutes, 16 seconds
- Distance travelled: 8,500,000 kilometres (5,300,000 mi)

Spacecraft properties
- Spacecraft: Space Shuttle Discovery
- Launch mass: 120,413 kilograms (265,466 lb)
- Landing mass: 102,220 kilograms (225,350 lb)

Crew
- Crew size: 7
- Members: Mark L. Polansky; William Oefelein; Nicholas Patrick; Robert Curbeam; Christer Fuglesang; Joan E. Higginbotham
- Launching: Sunita Williams
- Landing: Thomas Reiter

Start of mission
- Launch date: December 10, 2006, 01:47:35 UTC
- Launch site: Kennedy, LC-39B

End of mission
- Landing date: December 22, 2006, 22:32:00 UTC
- Landing site: Kennedy, SLF Runway 15

Orbital parameters
- Reference system: Geocentric
- Regime: Low Earth
- Perigee altitude: 326
- Apogee altitude: 358
- Inclination: 51.6 degrees
- Period: 91.37 minutes
- Epoch: December 12, 2006

Docking with ISS
- Docking port: PMA-2 (Destiny forward)
- Docking date: December 11, 2006, 22:12 UTC
- Undocking date: December 19, 2006, 22:10 UTC
- Time docked: 7 days, 23 hours, 58 minutes
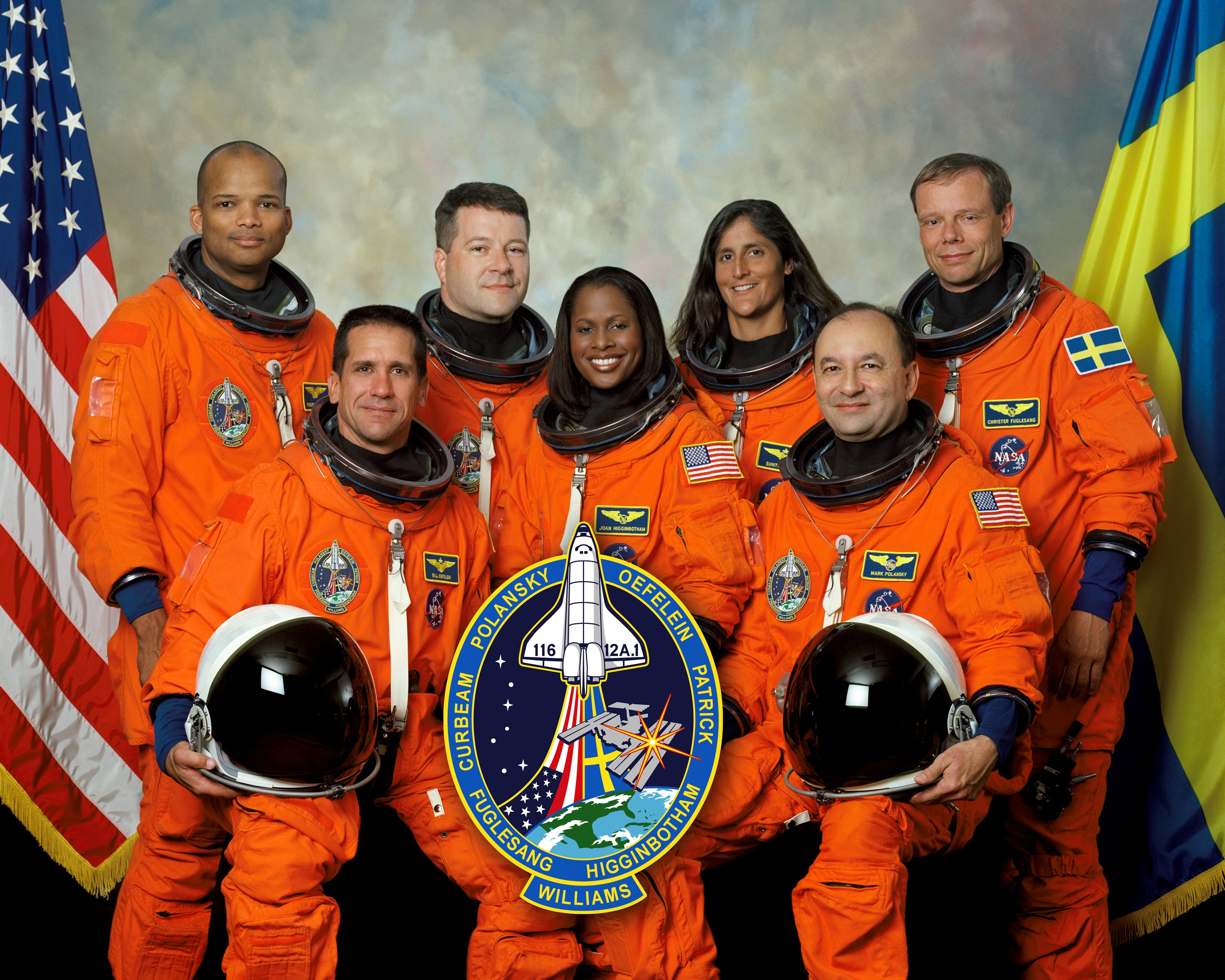
- Back (L-R): Curbeam, Patrick, Williams, Fuglesang; Front (L-R): Oefelein, Higginbotham, Polansky Space Shuttle program

STS-116 (also known as ISS-12A) was a Space Shuttle mission to the International Space Station (ISS) flown by Space Shuttle Discovery. Discovery lifted off on December 9, 2006, for her 33rd flight at 20:47:35 EST. A previous launch attempt on December 7 had been canceled due to cloud cover. It was the first night launch of a Space Shuttle since STS-113 in November 2002.

The mission is also referred to as ISS-12A.1 by the ISS program. The main goals of the mission were delivery and attachment of the International Space Station's P5 truss segment, a major rewiring of the station's power system, and exchange of ISS Expedition 14 personnel. The shuttle landed at 17:32 EST on December 22, 2006, at Kennedy Space Center 98 minutes off schedule due to unfavorable weather conditions. This mission was particularly notable to Sweden, being the first spaceflight of a Scandinavian astronaut (Christer Fuglesang). The European segment of the mission was called "Celsius".

STS-116 was the final scheduled Space Shuttle launch from Launch Complex 39B, as NASA began reconfiguring the pad for Ares I launches. Its only subsequent role in the Shuttle program was as a contingency launch site for STS-400, a proposed Launch On Need rescue mission for STS-125 in 2009, the final Hubble Space Telescope servicing flight, in the event of severe orbiter damage. Launch Complex 39B would not support another crewed launch for nearly two decades, until Artemis II.

After STS-116, Discovery entered a period of maintenance. Its next mission would be STS-120 starting on October 23, 2007.

== Crew ==
Position	Launching astronaut	Landing astronaut
Commander	Mark L. Polansky; Second spaceflight	
Pilot	William Oefelein; Only spaceflight	
Mission Specialist 1	Nicholas Patrick; First spaceflight	
Mission Specialist 2 Flight Engineer	Robert Curbeam; Third and last spaceflight	
Mission Specialist 3	Christer Fuglesang, ESA; First spaceflight	
Mission Specialist 4	Joan E. Higginbotham; Only spaceflight	
Mission Specialist 5	Sunita Williams; Expedition 14; First spaceflight ISS Flight Engineer	Thomas Reiter, ESA; Expedition 14; Second and last spaceflight ISS Flight Engineer

=== Crew notes ===
Originally this mission was to carry the Expedition 8 crew to the ISS. The original crew was to be:

Position	Launching astronaut	Landing astronaut
Commander	Terry Wilcutt	
Pilot	William Oefelein	
Mission Specialist 1	Christer Fuglesang, ESA	
Mission Specialist 2 Flight Engineer	Robert Curbeam	
Mission Specialist 3	Michael Foale; Expedition 8 ISS Commander	Yuri I. Malenchenko, RKA; Expedition 7 ISS Commander
Mission Specialist 4	Bill McArthur; Expedition 8 ISS Flight Engineer	Ed Lu; Expedition 7 ISS Flight Engineer
Mission Specialist 5	Valery Tokarev, RKA; Expedition 8 ISS Flight Engineer	Aleksandr Y. Kaleri, RKA; Expedition 7 ISS Flight Engineer

== Mission highlights ==
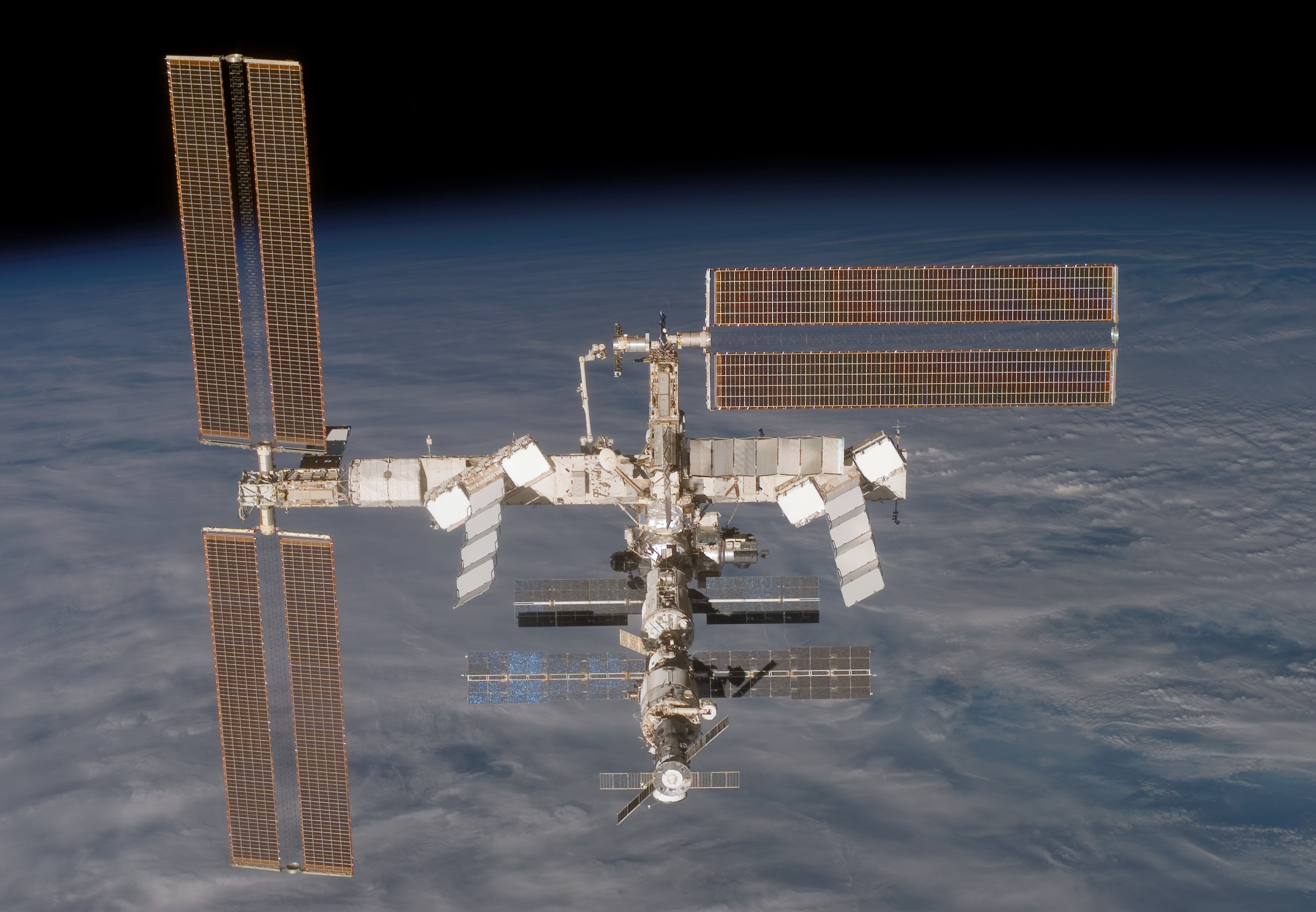
A photograph of the International Space Station after STS-116 with the new P5 truss segment

- The STS-116 mission delivered and attached the International Space Station's third port steel truss segment, the P5 truss.
- The STS-116 mission brought to the Station Expedition 14 crew member Sunita Williams (who subsequently established a record for most time in space for a female astronaut) and brought home Expedition 14 crew member Thomas Reiter from European Space Agency (launched by STS-121).
- Christer Fuglesang became Sweden's first astronaut. His flight was a rare occurrence of two ESA astronauts flying in space together.
- The third of three SPHERES testbeds launched to the ISS.
- Astronauts completed major rewiring of the electrical system of the International Space Station in order to bring online the P3/P4 solar array installed by STS-115 in September 2006.
- Additional rewiring was done to ISS Pressurized Mating Adapter 2 (PMA2) to enable Station-Shuttle Power Transfer System (SSPTS) commencing with STS-118.
- One half of the original P6 solar array installed by STS-97 was folded to make room for the new P4 array deployed by STS-115 to rotate and track the sun.
- STS-116 was the last STS mission scheduled for launch from pad 39B. The pad was then refitted for upcoming Ares I launches.
- The crew of STS-116 consisted of five rookie astronauts. Only Mission Commander Mark Polansky (2) and Mission specialist Robert Curbeam (3) had previously flown in space.
- Robert Curbeam became the first astronaut to make four EVAs during the same mission.
- This was the first mission with two African-American crewmembers.

=== Mission notes ===
As one of the main goals of STS-116 was to exchange ISS Expedition 14 crew members, the crew of STS-116 changed mid-flight. ISS Flight Engineer Sunita "Suni" Williams was part of the STS-116 crew for the first portion of the mission. She then replaced ISS Flight Engineer Thomas Reiter on the Expedition 14 crew and Reiter joined the STS-116 crew for the return to Earth.

=== Final Assembly Power Converter Unit mission for Discovery ===
During planned orbiter upgrades that took place subsequent to this mission, Discovery's Assembly Power Converter Units (APCUs) were removed and replaced with the shuttle-side components of the Station-Shuttle Power Transfer System (SSPTS). The APCUs converted 28VDC orbiter main bus power to 124VDC, compatible with the ISS's 120VDC main bus power. During initial station assembly missions, orbiter APCU power was used to augment the power available from the Russian service segment. With the operation of permanent main electrical systems (e.g. P4 array and SARJ, MBSUs, DDCUs, Ammonia cooling systems), orbiter power was no longer needed by the ISS.

After STS-118, Discovery and Endeavour drew power from the ISS, although Atlantis was never upgraded with the SSPTS. This system slowed the orbiters' consumption of hydrogen and oxygen used by their onboard electricity-generating fuel cells. The hydrogen and oxygen supplies, stored cryogenically in tanks aboard the orbiter, limited the duration of Space Shuttle missions. As a result of the changeover to SSPTS, Discovery and Endeavour gained approximately 50% of the time that would have been spent docked otherwise. This resulted in 2–4 extra days for each ISS-docked mission.

== Mission payloads ==
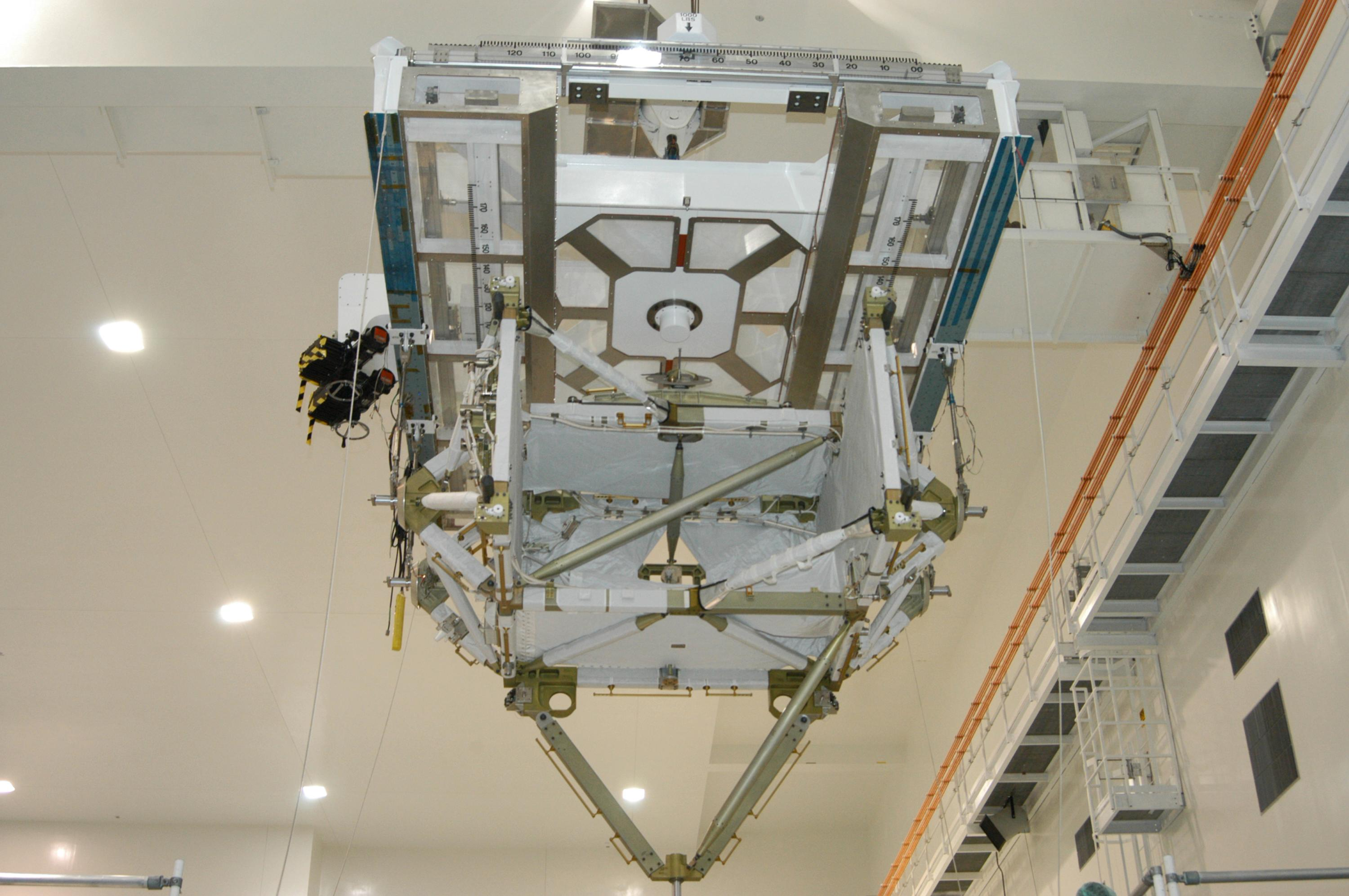
In the Space Station Processing Facility, an overhead crane moves the P5 truss for mission STS-116 to the payload transfer container.

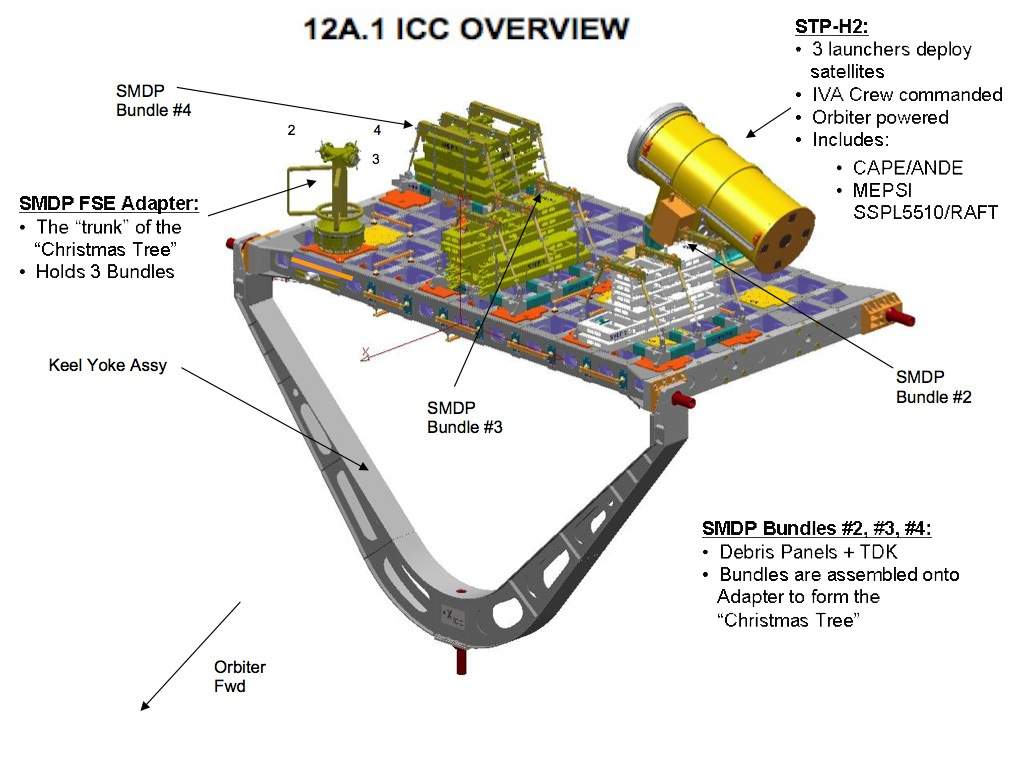
ICC STS-116

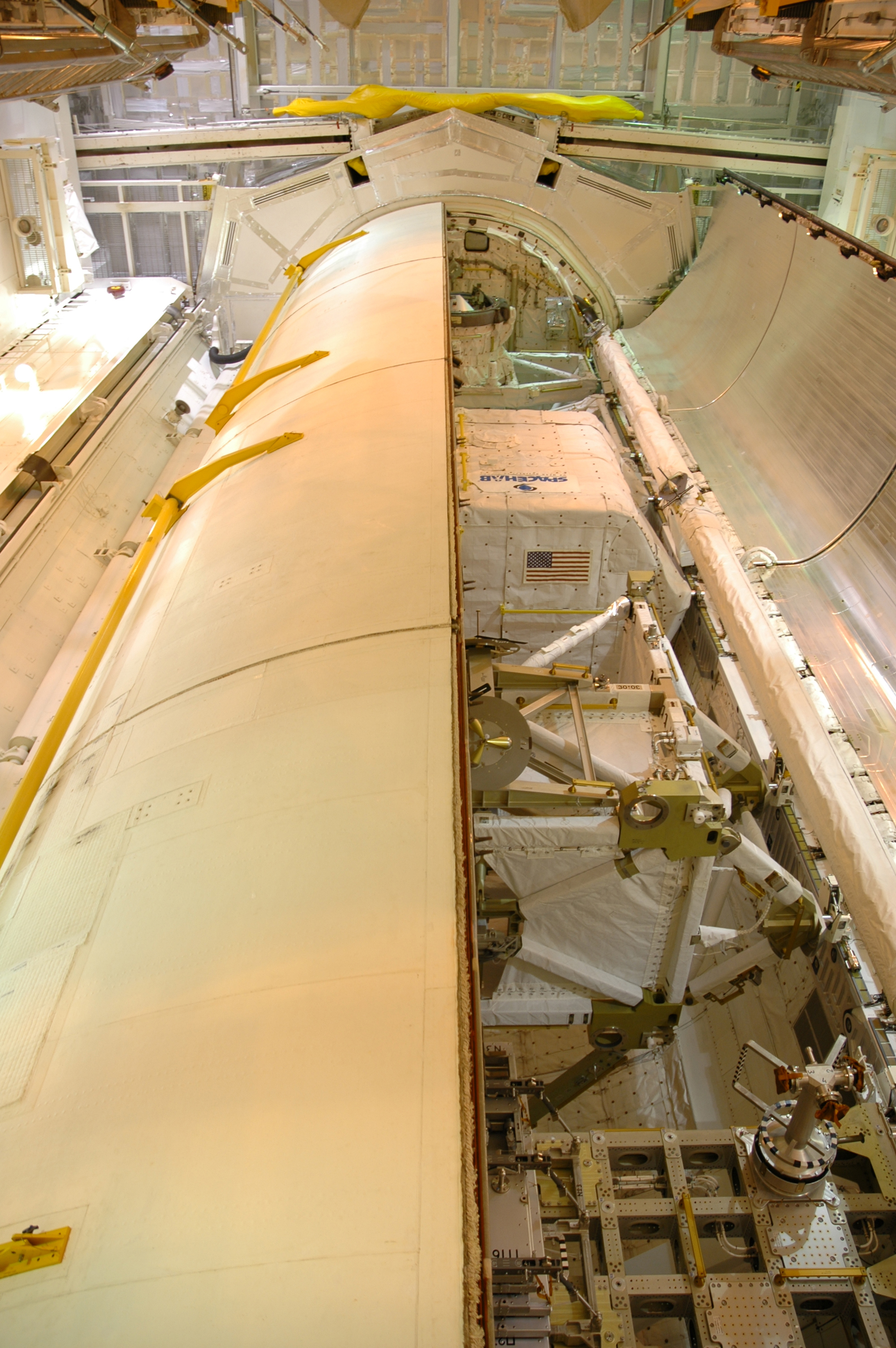
Discovery's payload bay, containing the SPACEHAB module and ISS P5 Truss.

The primary payload for the STS-116 mission was the P5 Truss segment of the International Space Station. The shuttle also carried a Spacehab Logistics Module to resupply the ISS, and an Integrated Cargo Carrier with four sub-satellites, which were deployed after undocking from the ISS: the ANDE technology demonstrator (OSCAR 61 and 62), developed by the Naval Research Laboratory, and three CubeSats (RAFT-1 (OSCAR 60) and MARScom for the United States Naval Academy, and MEPSI 2A/2B for DARPA). It was the first Shuttle mission to deploy satellites since STS-113 in 2002.

Location	Cargo	Mass
Bay 1–2	Orbiter Docking System	1,800 kilograms (4,000 lb)?
Bay 3	Tunnel Adapter	112 kilograms (247 lb)
Bay 4–5	Spacehab Logistics Module	5,399 kilograms (11,903 lb)
Bay 5P?	APCU (Assembly Power Converter Unit) (28VDC-to-124VDC) with SPDU (Station Power Distribution Unit)	2 x 35 kilograms (77 lb) 20 kilograms (44 lb)
Bay 7–8	Truss segment P5	1,860 kilograms (4,100 lb)
Bay 11–12	Integrated Cargo Carrier / 839 kilograms (1,850 lb); STP-H2, FRAM / 1,398 kilograms (3,082 lb); Service Module Debris Panels / 100 kilograms (220 lb)?; RAFT-1 / 4 kilograms (8.8 lb); MARScom / 3 kilograms (6.6 lb); MEPSI 2A/2B / 3 kilograms (6.6 lb); ANDE launch cylinder / 20 kilograms (44 lb)?; ANDE-MAA / 50 kilograms (110 lb); ANDE-FCAL / 75 kilograms (165 lb)	total 2,942 kilograms (6,486 lb)
Sill	OBSS (Orbital Boom Sensor System) 202	450 kilograms (990 lb)?
Sill	RMS 303	390 kilograms (860 lb)
		Total 12,500 kilograms (27,600 lb)

=== Crew seat assignments ===
Seat	Launch	Landing	Seats 1–4 are on the flight deck. Seats 5–7 are on the mid-deck.
1	Polansky		Seats 1–4 are on the flight deck. Seats 5–7 are on the mid-deck.
2	Oefelein		Seats 1–4 are on the flight deck. Seats 5–7 are on the mid-deck.
3	Patrick	Higginbotham	Seats 1–4 are on the flight deck. Seats 5–7 are on the mid-deck.
4	Curbeam		Seats 1–4 are on the flight deck. Seats 5–7 are on the mid-deck.
5	Fuglesang		Seats 1–4 are on the flight deck. Seats 5–7 are on the mid-deck.
6	Higginbotham	Patrick	Seats 1–4 are on the flight deck. Seats 5–7 are on the mid-deck.
7	Williams	Reiter	Seats 1–4 are on the flight deck. Seats 5–7 are on the mid-deck.

== Mission background ==
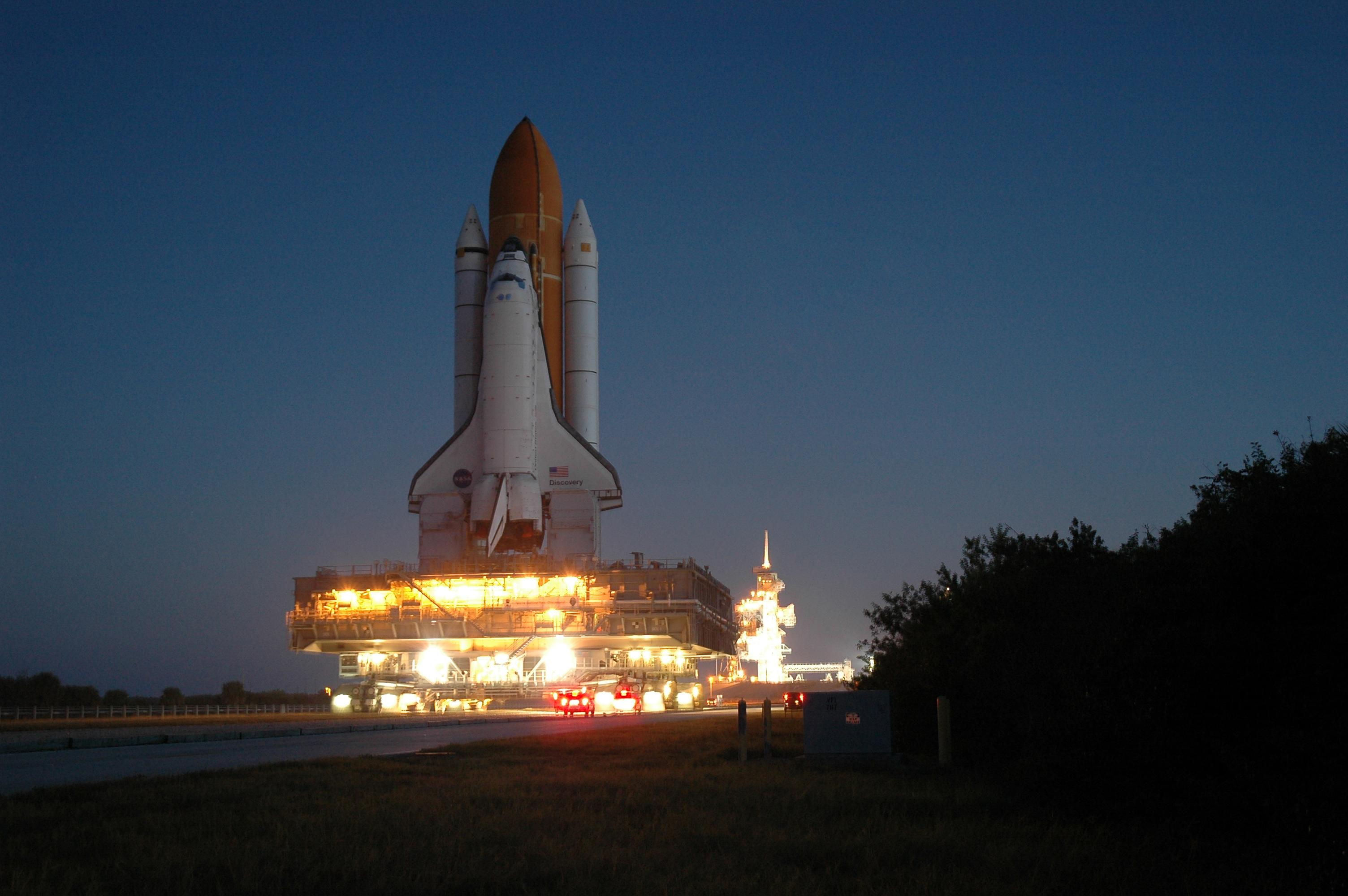
Discovery on its way to Launchpad 39B during rollout.

STS-116 was planned (post return-to-flight) to launch on December 14, 2006. But on November 29, 2006 NASA announced that the launch team had been asked to aim for a launch on December 7, 2006, rather than the original target date of December 14. The launch window for the STS-116 mission opened on December 7 and extended through December 17. The seven-member flight crew arrived for launch at Kennedy's Shuttle Landing Facility on December 3, 2006, in the afternoon. Primary payloads on the 13-day mission were the P5 integrated truss segment, SPACEHAB single logistics module, and an integrated cargo carrier. The STS-116 mission was the 20th Shuttle flight to the station.

Launch on the new, earlier date required a night-time launch. Subsequent to the Columbia disaster, NASA had imposed rules requiring shuttle launches to be conducted during the day, when light would be sufficient for cameras to observe falling debris. With the redesign of shuttle tank foam having minimized the amount of falling debris and the availability of in-orbit inspection procedures, the daylight-launch requirement was relaxed.

Rollover of Discovery to the Vehicle Assembly Building (VAB) occurred on October 31, and on November 1 the orbiter was raised into a vertical orientation and moved into High Bay 3 to be mated with the external tank and solid rocket boosters. Rollout to Launch Complex 39B was completed on Thursday November 11.

The crew for the mission arrived at Kennedy Space Center on November 13 to begin their final four-day prelaunch training for the mission, which included familiarization activities, rehearsal of emergency procedures and practice on NASA's Shuttle Training Aircraft, along with a simulated countdown, which took place on the morning of November 16, 2006. The astronauts then traveled to Johnson Space Center in Houston, Texas, and returned to Kennedy Space Center on December 3, 2006, four days before the planned launch date.

The payloads for the mission, including a SPACEHAB module and the P5 truss, were loaded from the payload canister into Discovery's payload bay on November 16, and, with the sealing of the payload bay doors, all that remained was to fill the external fuel tank before the Discovery shuttle stack was in full launch configuration. With the completion of the Flight Readiness Review over November 28–29 (which evaluated all activities and elements necessary for the safe and successful performance of the shuttle during the mission, including the Orbiter itself, the payload and flight crew), Discovery was given her Certificate of Flight Readiness, the launch date was officially set to December 7, 2006, and the mission officially given the "Go" for launch.

== Mission timeline ==
=== December 7 (Launch attempt 1) ===
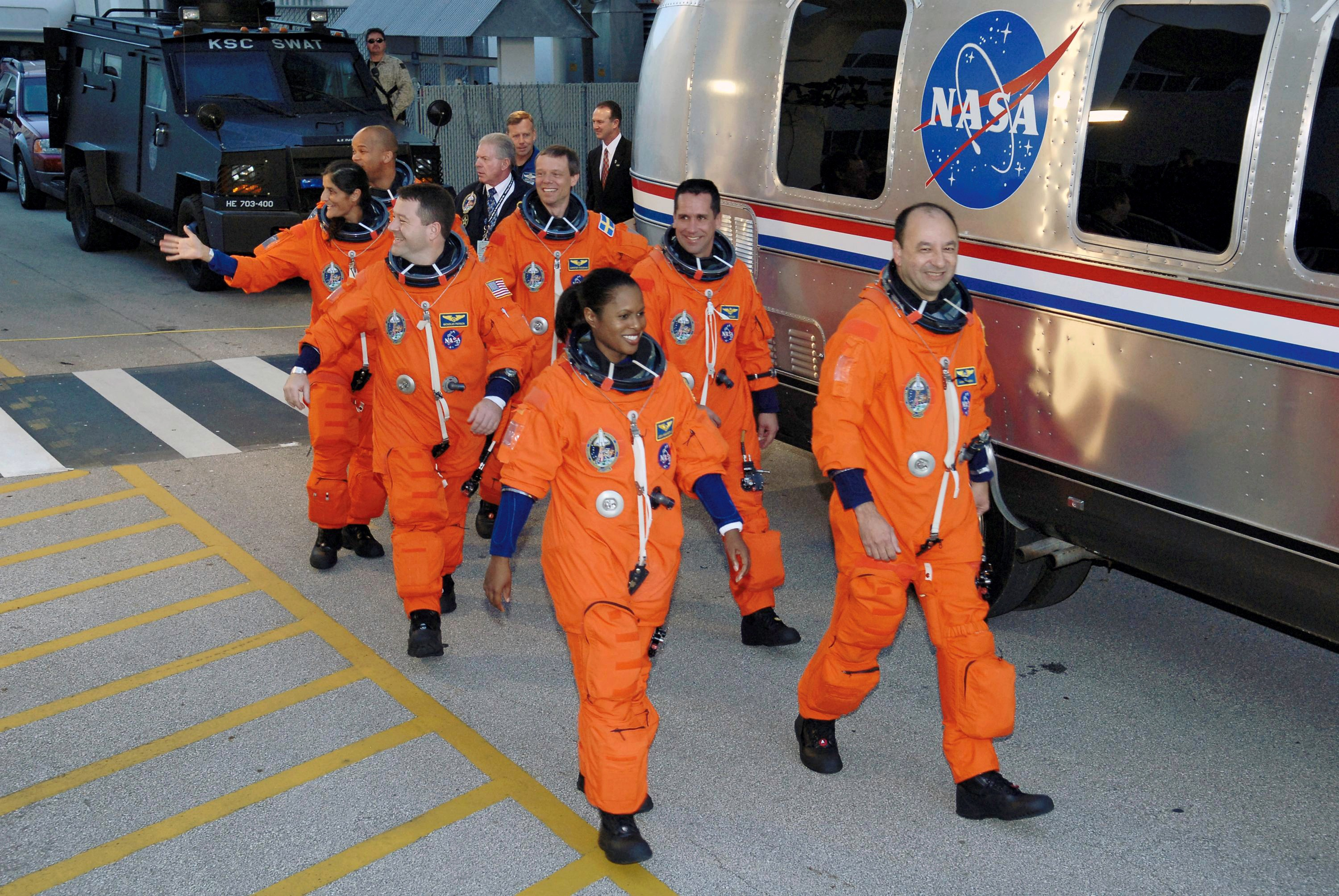
STS-116 crew about to board the astrovan for the trip to pad 39B.

Following the completion of the pre-launch preparations, all eyes were on the Florida skies, due to a forecast low cloud ceiling for the night of the launch. The mission's seven astronauts were loaded into Discovery ready for the scheduled launch at 21:37 EST, with hopes high for a break in the clouds, but as the scheduled launch time approached it became apparent that the cloud would not break, and the launch attempt was scrubbed, with the next attempt scheduled for December 9, 2006. Prior to the initial attempt on December 7, NASA had determined that they would not attempt a launch on Friday because of a cold front moving in that eventually scrubbed Thursday's launch attempt.

Attempt	Planned	Result	Turnaround	Reason	Decision point	Weather go (%)	Notes
1	7 Dec 2006, 9:35:48 pm	Scrubbed	—	Weather	7 Dec 2006, 9:36 pm (T−00:05:00)	40%	Low cloud cover. NASA opted for 48-hour turnaround instead of 24 due to 10% go weather forecast for December 8, 2006.
2	9 Dec 2006, 8:47:35 pm	Success	1 day 23 hours 12 minutes			70%	High winds and low clouds were a concern but cleared in time for launch.

=== December 9 (Flight day 1 – Launch) ===
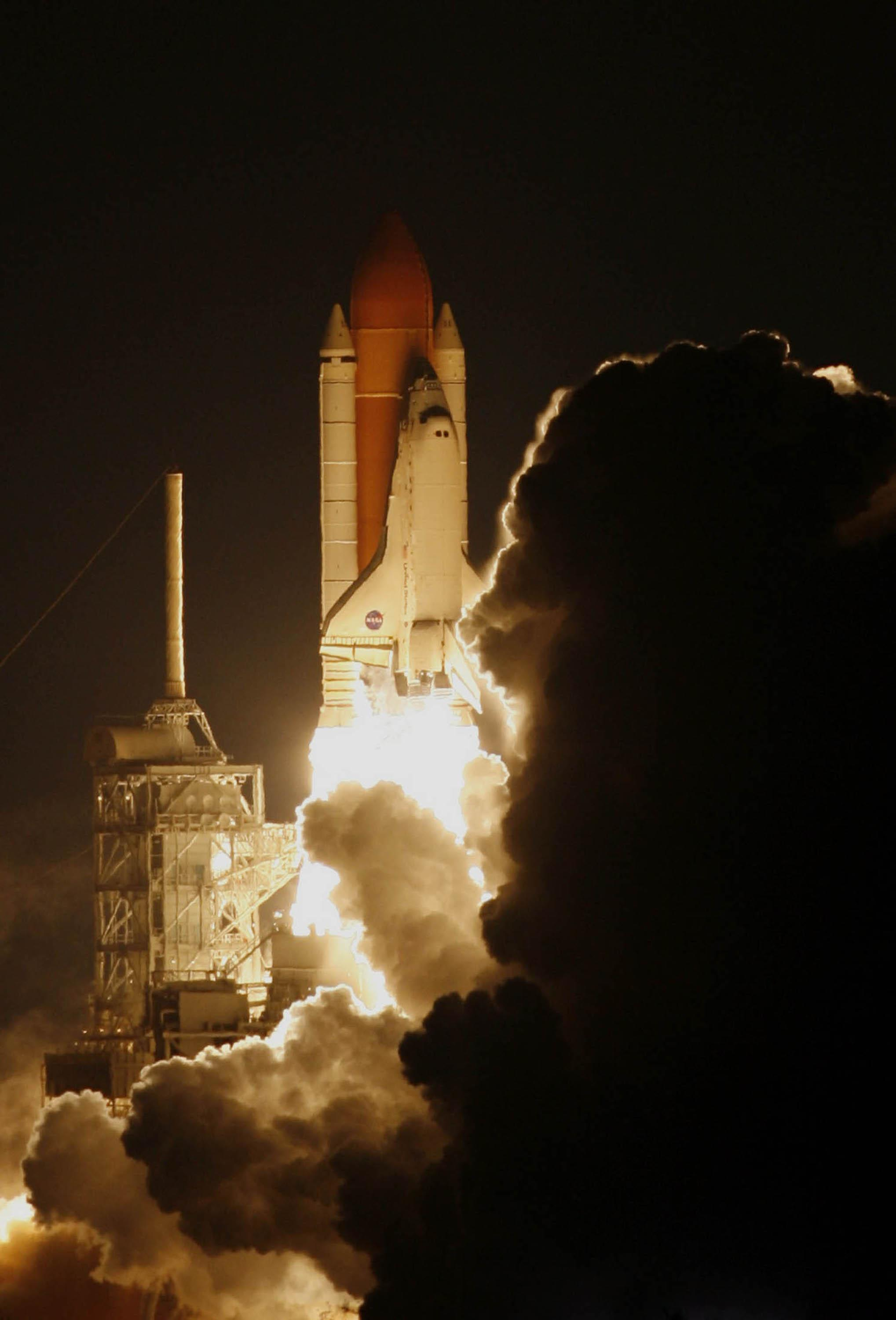
Discovery at liftoff

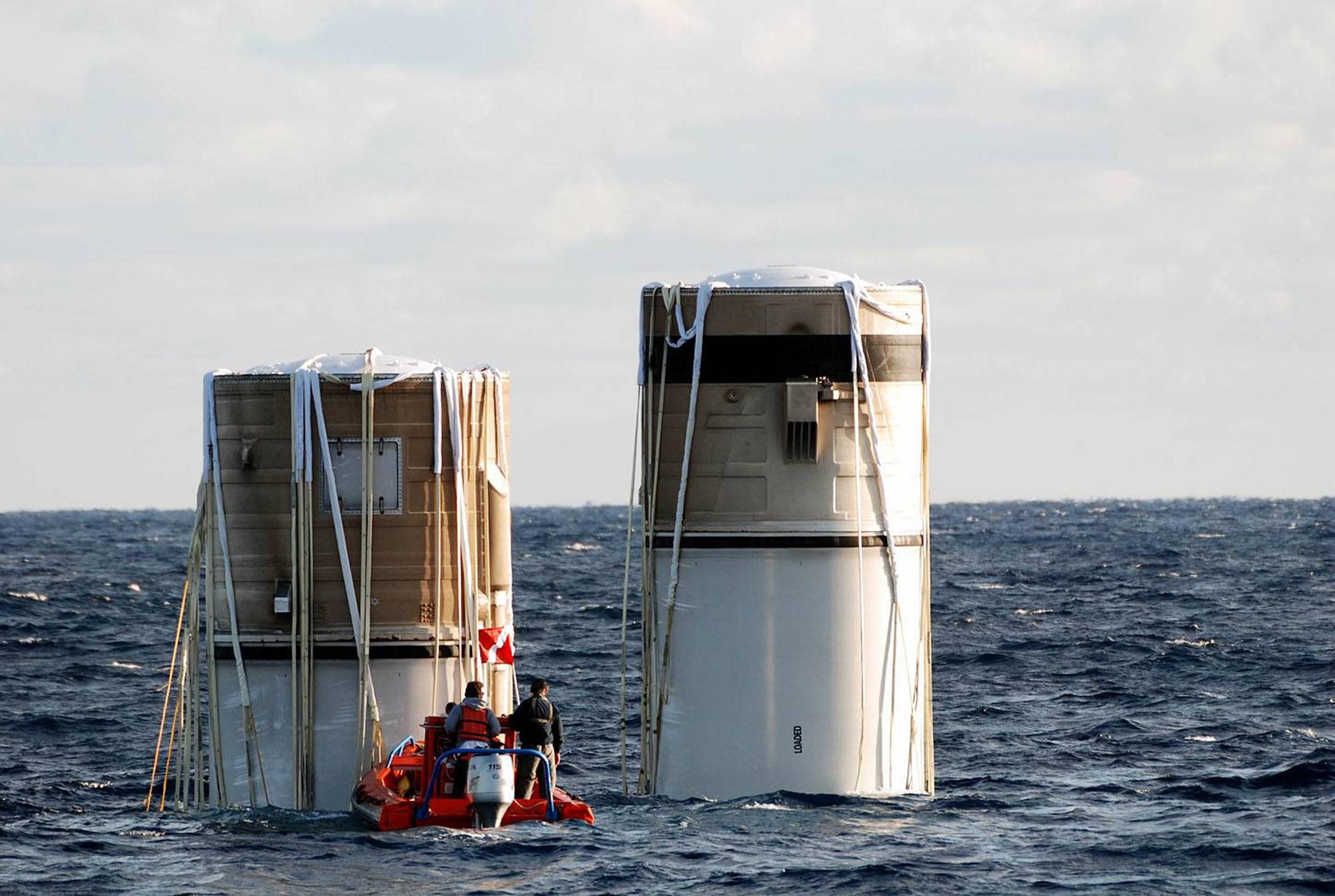
The solid rocket boosters being retrieved from the Atlantic Ocean after the takeoff of STS-116.

Video of the launch.

Discovery lifted off successfully at 8:47 pm EST (01:47 UTC), lighting up the Florida's coastline. Weather conditions – in particular crosswinds at the launch and landing sites – continued to trend positively in the hours approaching the launch window Saturday night. The fueling process for Discovery's external tanks began at 12:46 EST (17:46 UTC) and was completed at approximately 15:45 EST (20:45 UTC). If a transatlantic abort landing (TAL) had been required during ascent, the shuttle had three possible landing sites: Zaragoza or Morón Air Base in Spain, or Istres, France.

The launch was the third shuttle mission in five months, being preceded by STS-121 in July and STS-115 in September, and was the first night launch in four years since STS-113 and first night launch following the Columbia accident during STS-107. It is also the last time a shuttle launched from LC-39B.

=== December 10 (Flight day 2) ===
Flight day 2 began for the astronauts at 15:47 UTC. The first order of business for the day was a thorough inspection of the Shuttle. Using sensors and cameras attached to a fifty-foot boom, which was in turn connected to a fifty-foot robotic arm, Nicholas Patrick inspected the leading edge of the wings and the nose cap. The process, which took five and a half hours, suffered a minor glitch that required Patrick to order the arm to manually grab the boom. During this time, the crew also inspected the upper surface of the orbiter. Astronauts also completed a check of the spacesuits to be used during the mission, along with preparation for docking with the International Space Station.

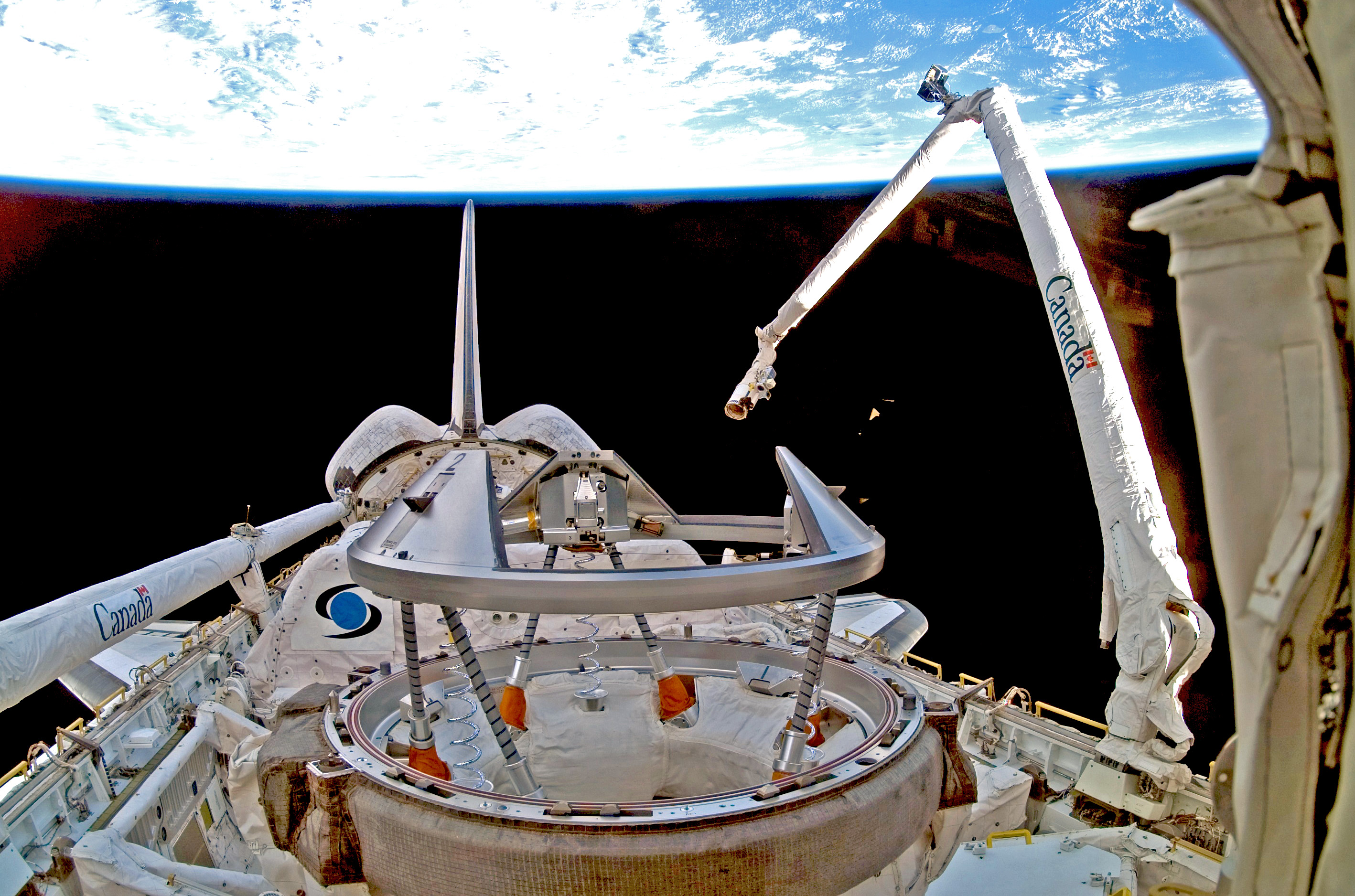
As seen through windows on the aft flight deck of Space Shuttle Discovery, the payload bay is featured in this image photographed by a STS-116 Crewmember.

=== December 11 (Flight day 3 – Docking to ISS) ===
Flight day 3 began for the astronauts at 15:18 UTC. Following the rendezvous pitch maneuver, docking to the International Space Station occurred at 22:12 UTC. The hatch between the International Space Station and Discovery was opened at 23:54 UTC. The joint ISS/Shuttle crew then worked to undertake some further detailed inspection of the orbiter and unloaded the P5 truss segment from the payload bay, handing it off successfully from the shuttle robotic arm to the station arm. The astronauts scheduled for Day 4's EVA, Robert Curbeam and Christer Fuglesang, ended their day by entering the airlock for a "campout" sleep session to prepare for the EVA by purging their bodies of nitrogen in a lower-pressure environment. Such a practice is common in order for the astronauts to avoid getting decompression sickness.

=== December 12 (Flight day 4 – EVA #1) ===
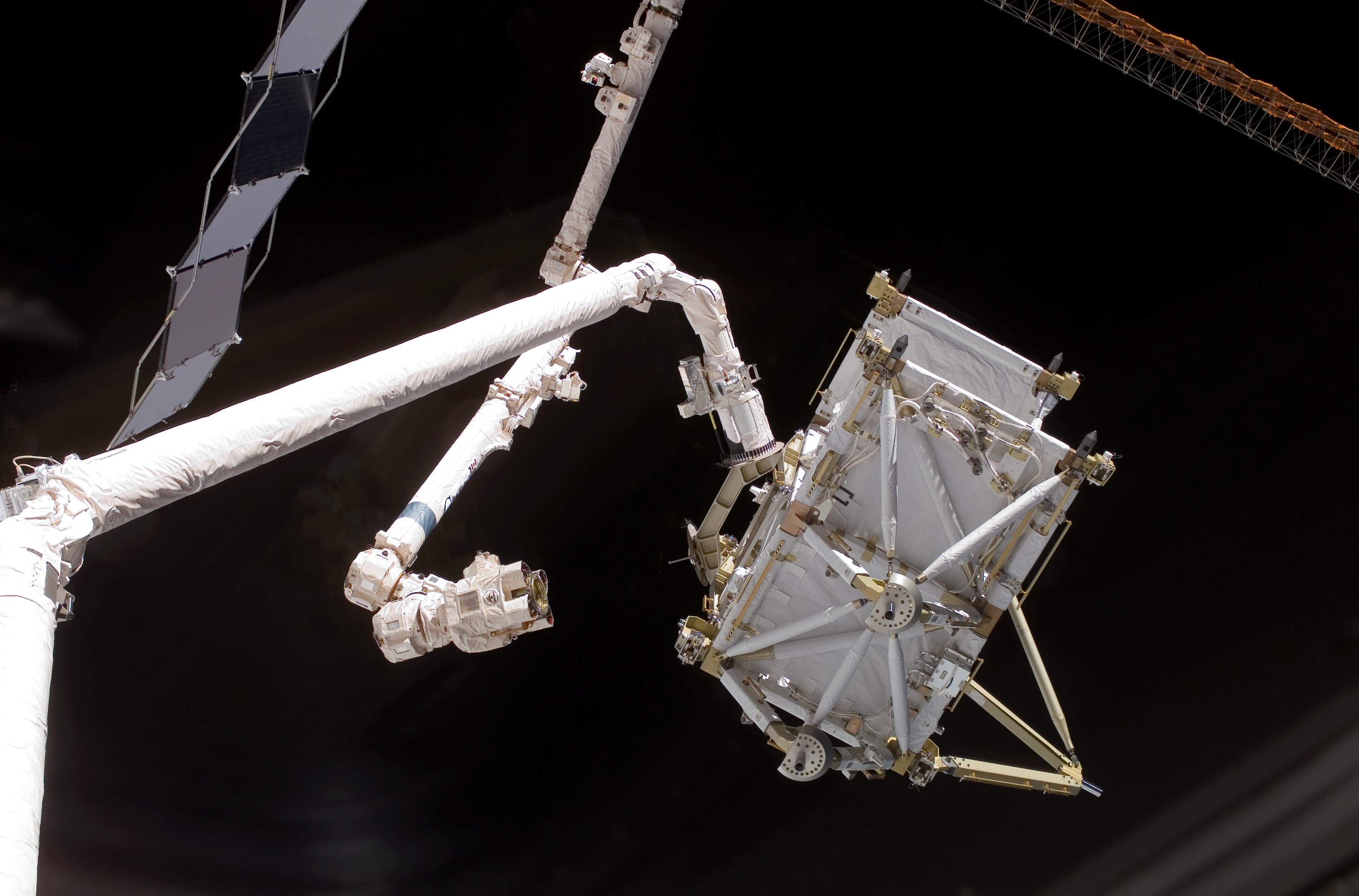
Space Shuttle Discovery's Canadarm-1 robotic arm hands off the P5 truss section to the International Space Station's Canadarm-2 during shuttle mission STS-116 in December 2006.

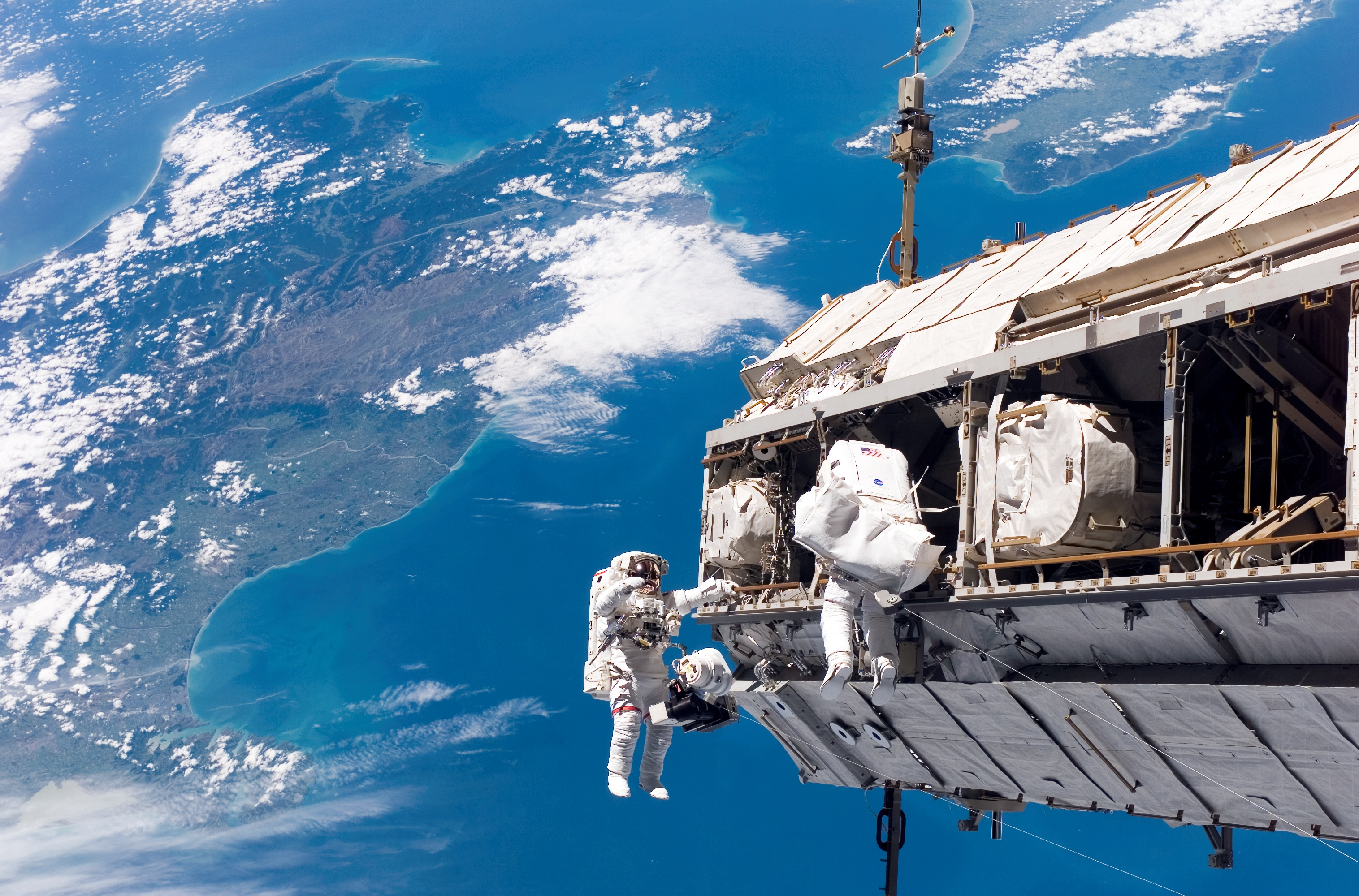
While flying east of New Zealand, Robert L. Curbeam Jr. and Christer Fuglesang participate in the mission's first spacewalk.

Flight day 4 began for the astronauts at 15:47 UTC. During the first EVA of the mission, the astronauts of STS-116 brought the ISS one step closer to completion with the addition of the P5 truss segment.

The EVA began at 20:31 UTC, with Curbeam and Fuglesang removing launch restraints from the P5 truss and Mission Specialist Joan Higginbotham making use of the station's robotic arm (the Canadarm2) to move the truss segment to within inches of its new position on the P4 truss. The spacewalkers then guided Higginbotham with visual cues as the precise operation to finalize the attachment of the truss was completed.

After the P5's attachment, Curbeam and Fuglesang finalized the installation with power, data and heater cable connections. They also replaced a faulty video camera attached to the S1 truss. Since they worked ahead of the time-line, the two astronauts were also able to complete some get-ahead tasks.

At the end of the spacewalk, Curbeam congratulated the Nobel Prize winners, including scientist Dr. John C. Mather at NASA's Goddard Space Flight Center in Greenbelt, Maryland. Mather was honored for his work on the big-bang theory. Christer Fuglesang also held a short speech in Swedish, encouraging Swedes and others to aspire to become future astronauts. The EVA concluded at 03:07 UTC on the morning of December 13, and lasted for 6 hours and 36 minutes in total.

During the spacewalk, after taking a close look at imagery gathered on the first three days of the flight, mission managers determined that the shuttle's heat shield would support a safe return to Earth. They also decided a more detailed inspection that had been scheduled for later in the mission would not be necessary.

Three more spacewalks, one of which was unplanned, were required to reconfigure and redistribute power on the station, so that the solar arrays installed during STS-115 could be used. The first step of reconfiguring the power took place Wednesday when the port solar array on the P6 truss was retracted, which allowed the activation and rotation of the Solar Alpha Rotary Joint on the P4. The rotary joint allows the solar arrays on the P4 to track the Sun.

The astronauts were required to spend the night sleeping in protected areas in order to avoid radiation from a solar flare eruption.

=== December 13 (Flight day 5 – Solar Array Reorganization) ===
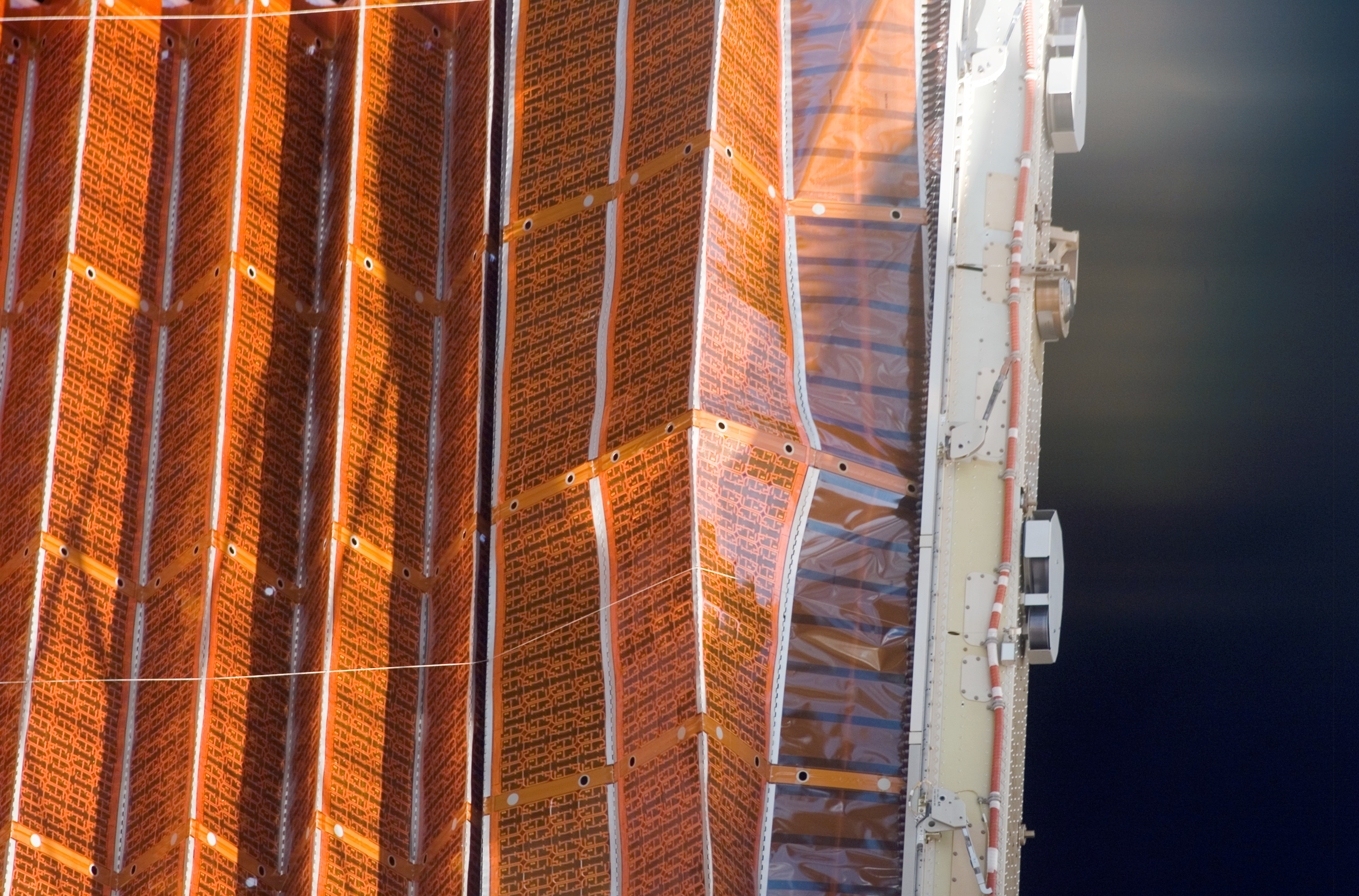
A kink that occurred in the port-side P6 solar array during the first attempt to retract that array on December 13.

Flight day 5 began for the astronauts at 15:21 UTC. The most high-profile activity was the attempted retraction of the P6 port-side solar array. The process began at 18:28 UTC, but problems with the array folding due to 'kinks' and 'billows' led the controllers to redeploy the array (from about 40% retracted). There then followed a series of more than 40 commands to furl and unfurl the arrays in an effort to get them properly aligned and folded.

At 00:50 UTC, the retraction efforts were abandoned for the day. The problems, which appear to have been caused by a loss of tension in the solar array guide wires, had still not been solved, although 14 of the 31 bays on the array had been retracted (leaving 17 bays extended). This was enough to leave the port side arrays in a safe position to commence the activation of the Solar Alpha Rotary Joint (SARJ) at 01:00 UTC, allowing the solar arrays on the P3/P4 truss to rotate to follow the sun.

=== December 14 (Flight day 6 – EVA #2) ===
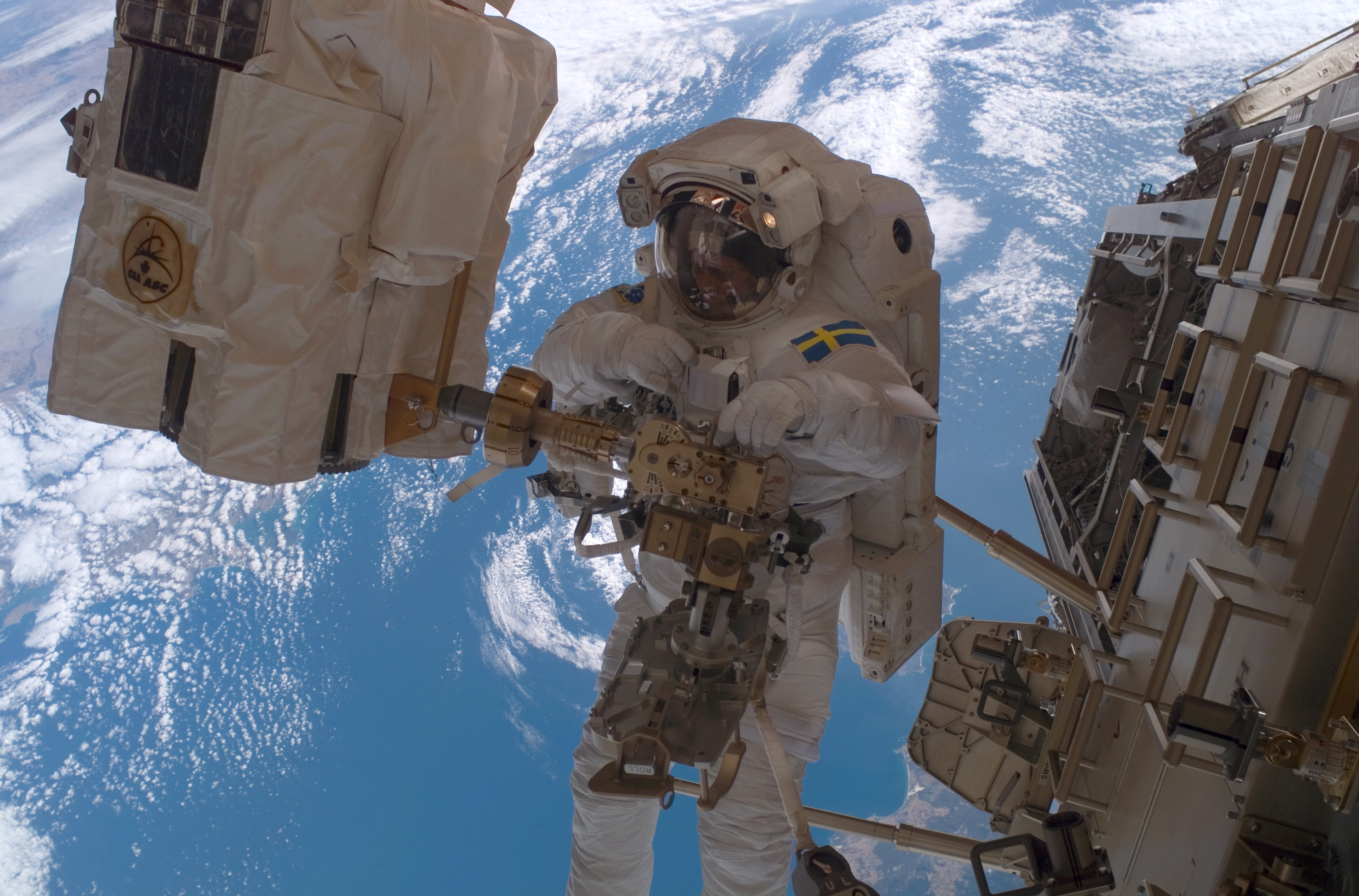
Christer Fuglesang participates in the mission's second session of extravehicular activity.

Flight day 6 began for the astronauts at 15:19 UTC. The day's primary activity, EVA No. 2, began rewiring work to bring the station's permanent electrical power systems into use. To allow this changeover, station controllers had to power down about half the systems on the ISS. The EVA started at 19:41 UTC with Bob Curbeam and Christer Fuglesang exiting the Quest airlock, 30 minutes early. EVA No. 2 was planned to activate channels 2 and 3 of the four-channel electrical system, and the work progressed smoothly. About two hours into the spacewalk the first current was flowing through the reconfigured system, using the power from the P4 solar arrays for the first time. The EVA was completed in exactly 5 hours, finishing at 00:41 UTC.

=== December 15 (Flight day 7) ===
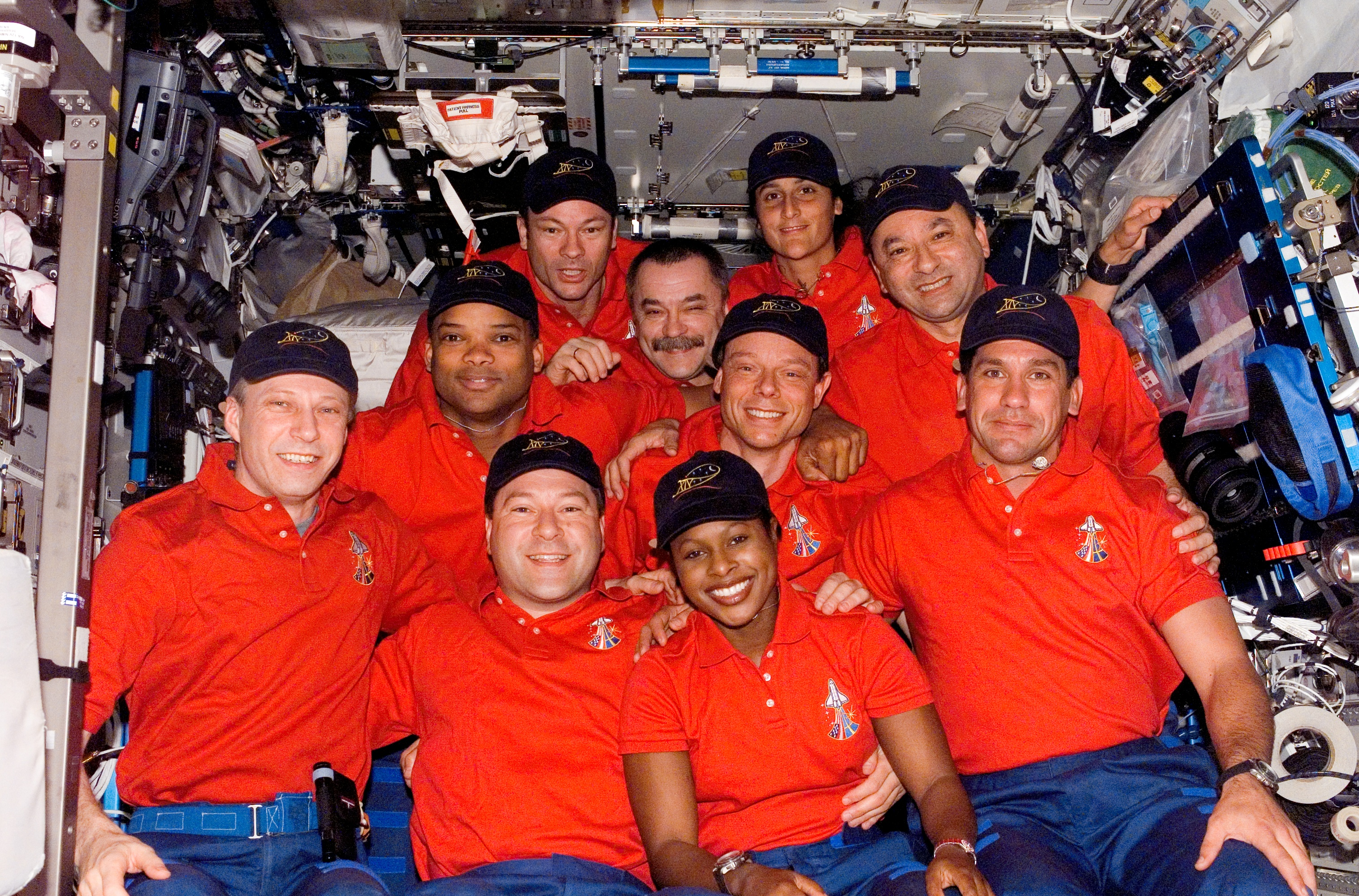
Crew photo.

Flight day 7 was a light work day for the crews of Discovery and the ISS after the previous days' activities. Spacewalkers Bob Curbeam and Christer Fuglesang enjoyed some R&R, while the rest of the crew performed cleanup and preparatory tasks for Flight day 8's planned EVA #3. The traditional joint photo session and joint news conference were held by the crews. During this event Swedish first time astronaut Christer Fuglesang was interviewed by Crown Princess Victoria and also set a 20-second Frisbee world record in space, broadcast live on Swedish TV4.

In an attempt to free a stuck solar panel, Thomas Reiter exercised vigorously on a machine which is known to cause oscillations in the solar arrays; it was not successful. Mission controllers continued to look at other solutions to the solar panel folding problem so as to enable complete retraction, including an extended or additional EVA.

=== December 16 (Flight day 8 – EVA #3) ===
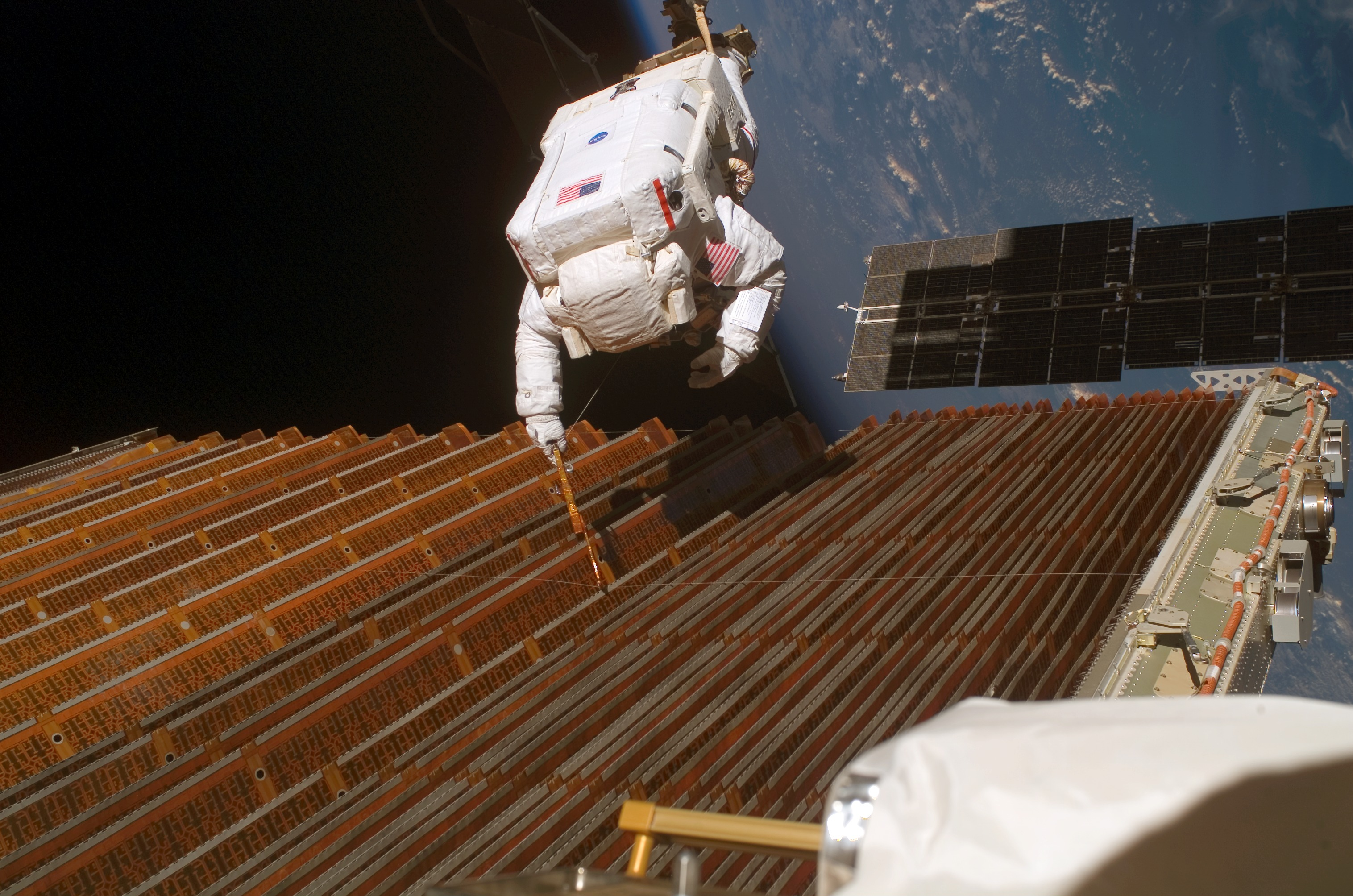
Astronaut Robert L. Curbeam Jr., STS-116 mission specialist, works with the port overhead solar array wing on the International Space Station's P6 truss during the mission's fourth session of extravehicular activity.

Flight day 8 began for the astronauts at 14:48 UTC. Astronauts Bob Curbeam and 'Suni' Williams completed the rewiring work on the International Space Station. The EVA began at 19:25 UTC and proceeded normally. As an "add-on task" to the EVA, astronauts Curbeam and Williams also continued work on the retraction of a sticking solar array, enabling the retraction of another six sections of the P6 array. At the end of the EVA there were another 11 "bays", or 35% left to retract. Upon completion of the EVA, the astronauts returned to the ISS via the Quest airlock.

Another significant event during the EVA was the loss of 'Suni' Williams' digital camera. At the post-EVA press conference it was suggested that a tether got snagged and caused the camera release button to break off allowing the camera to fall out of its holder. Images were lost but it was determined there was no need to retake them. Curbeam later said to the MCC: "We've got the bracket and the tether. Looks like the screws [on the bracket] came loose, we have the screws and the bracket and the tether."

=== December 17 (Flight day 9) ===
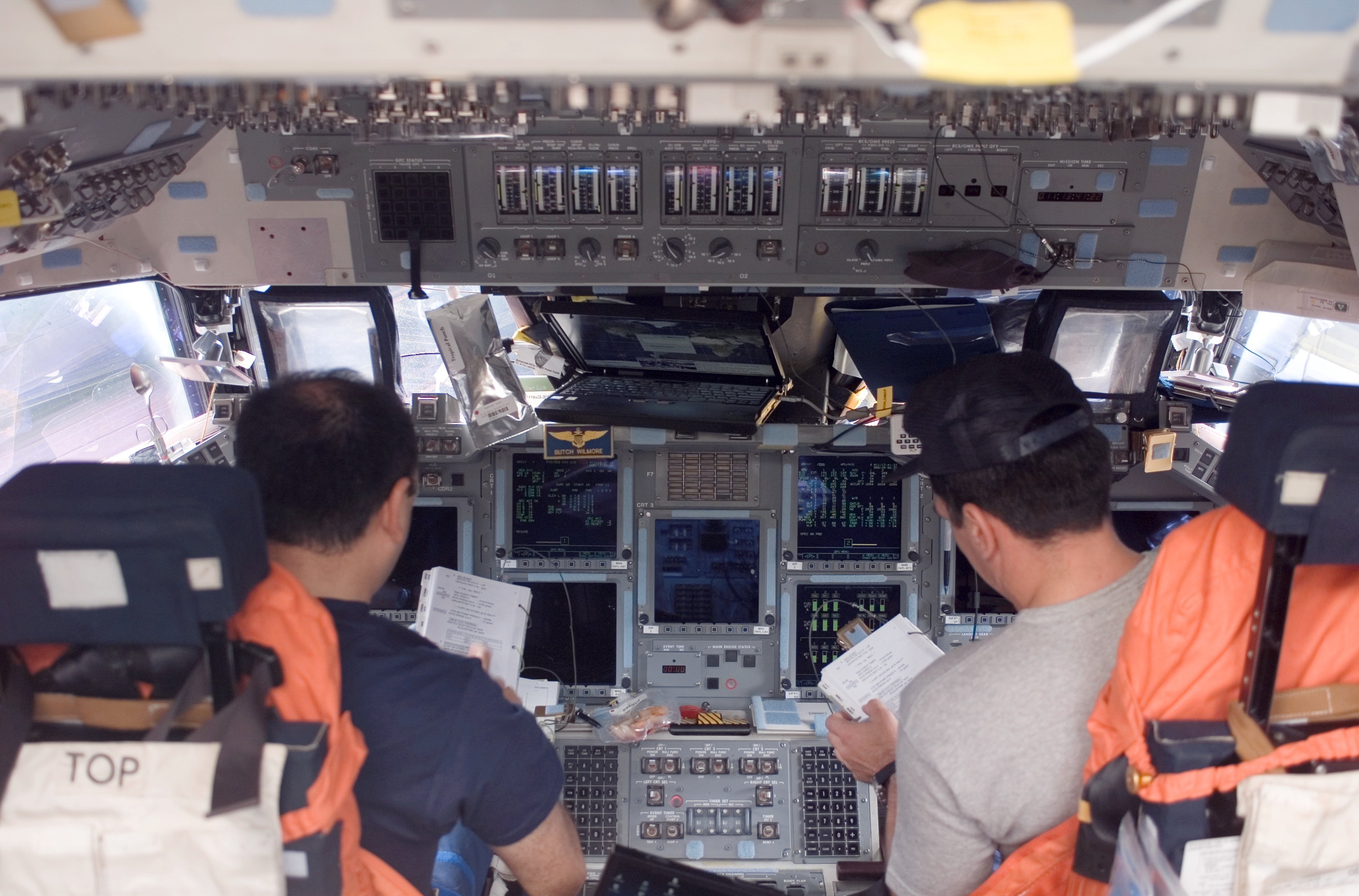
Flight deck of Discovery.

Flight day 9 was mainly spent preparing for EVA #4. The space suits were prepared (adjusting sizes and replacing LiOH canisters) and the crew went through the new procedures which had been developed for attempting to enable the solar array retraction. Various tools were coated in kapton tape to protect the array from coming into direct contact with sharp metallic objects and to provide electrical insulation if they are used to manipulate the arrays during the EVA.

=== December 18 (Flight day 10 – EVA #4) ===
Flight day 10 began for the astronauts at 14:17 UTC. Bob Curbeam and Christer Fuglesang embarked on an added EVA at 17:12 UTC to try to fully close the last eleven bays of the balky P6-port Solar Array Wing. The rapidly planned EVA was successfully completed after a 6-hour 38-minute spacewalk. At the end of EVA No. 4, Curbeam ranked fifth in total EVA time for U.S. astronauts and 14th overall.

=== December 19 (Flight day 11 – Undocking) ===
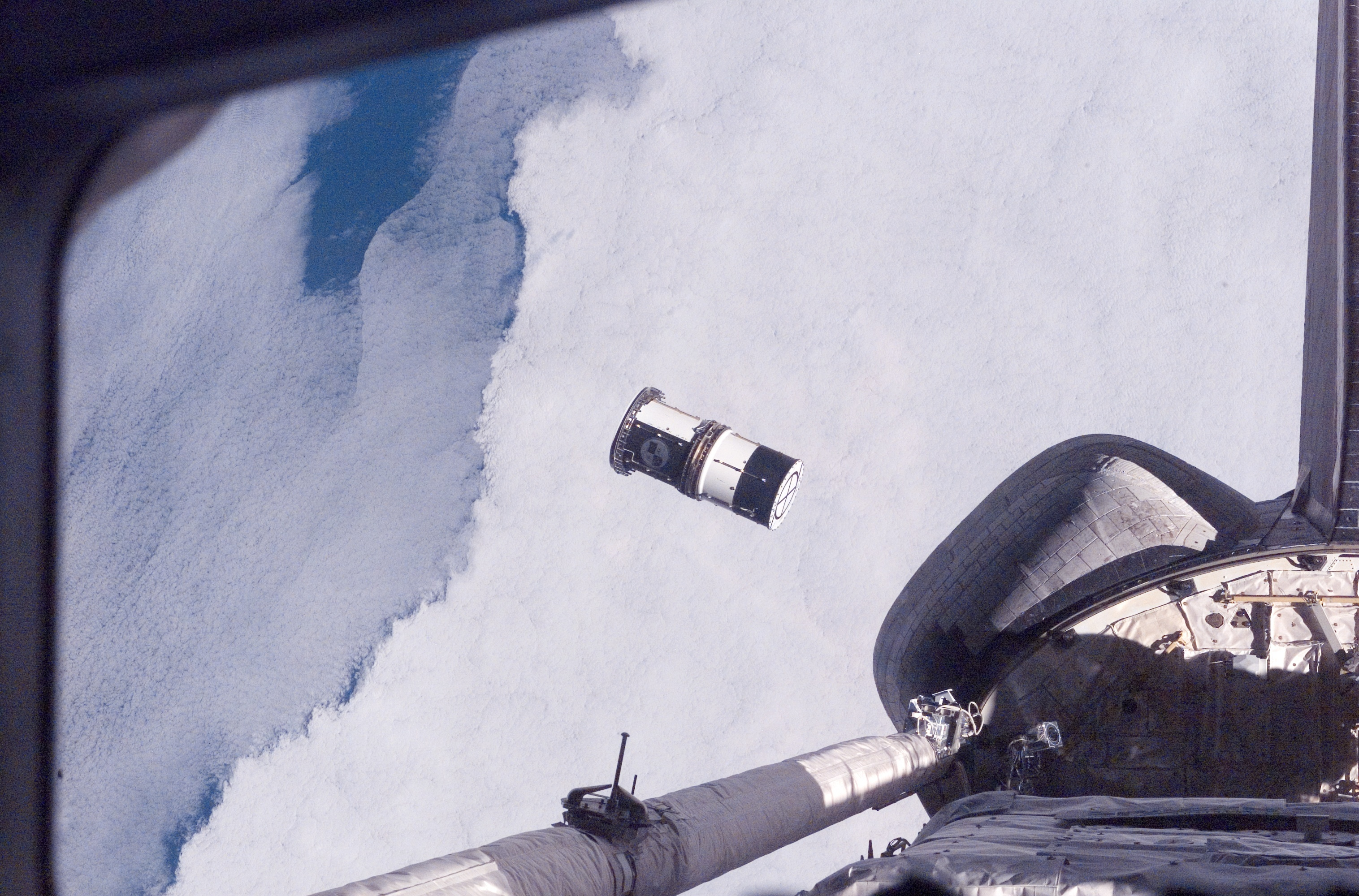
As seen through windows on the aft flight deck of Space Shuttle Discovery, a Department of Defense picosatellite known as Atmospheric Neutral Density Experiment (ANDE) is released from the shuttle's payload bay.

Flight day 11 began for the astronauts at approximately 14:47 UTC. The Expedition 14 and STS-116 crews posed for photos and then closed the hatches between the ISS and Discovery. Undocking was complete at 22:10 UTC. Due to the extended mission for EVA No. 4, Discovery did not make a full circle to film and photograph ISS, but only flew slightly more than one-quarter of the way around (through ISS zenith) before its departure burn.

=== December 20 (Flight day 12) ===
Flight day 12 began for the astronauts at 12:48 UTC. They spent the day verifying the integrity of Discovery's heat shield and preparing for deorbit and landing on December 22, 2006 (Flight day 14). Because of the extended spaceflight, the shuttle was required to make a landing attempt on flight day 14 unless all three landing sites were "no-go." Two satellites were also launched: MEPSI (Microelectromechanical System-Based PICOSAT Inspector) resembles a pair of tethered coffee-cups, and is being tested as a reconnaissance option for disabled satellites; RAFT (Radar Fence Transponder) is a pair of 5" cubes built by the U.S. Naval Academy which will test space radar systems and also act as data relays for mobile ground communications.

=== December 21 (Flight day 13) ===
Flight day 13 began for the astronauts at 12:17 UTC. Discovery's crew launched the ANDE (Atmospheric Neutral Density Experiment) microsats for the Naval Research Laboratory, which were designed to measure the density and composition of the low Earth orbit atmosphere in order to help better predict the movements of objects in orbit, but one of the satellites failed to emerge from its launch canister. ANDE is currently transmitting data, and emerged from the canister approximately 30 minutes after its launch according to satellite tracking data.

=== December 22 (Flight day 14 – Landing) ===
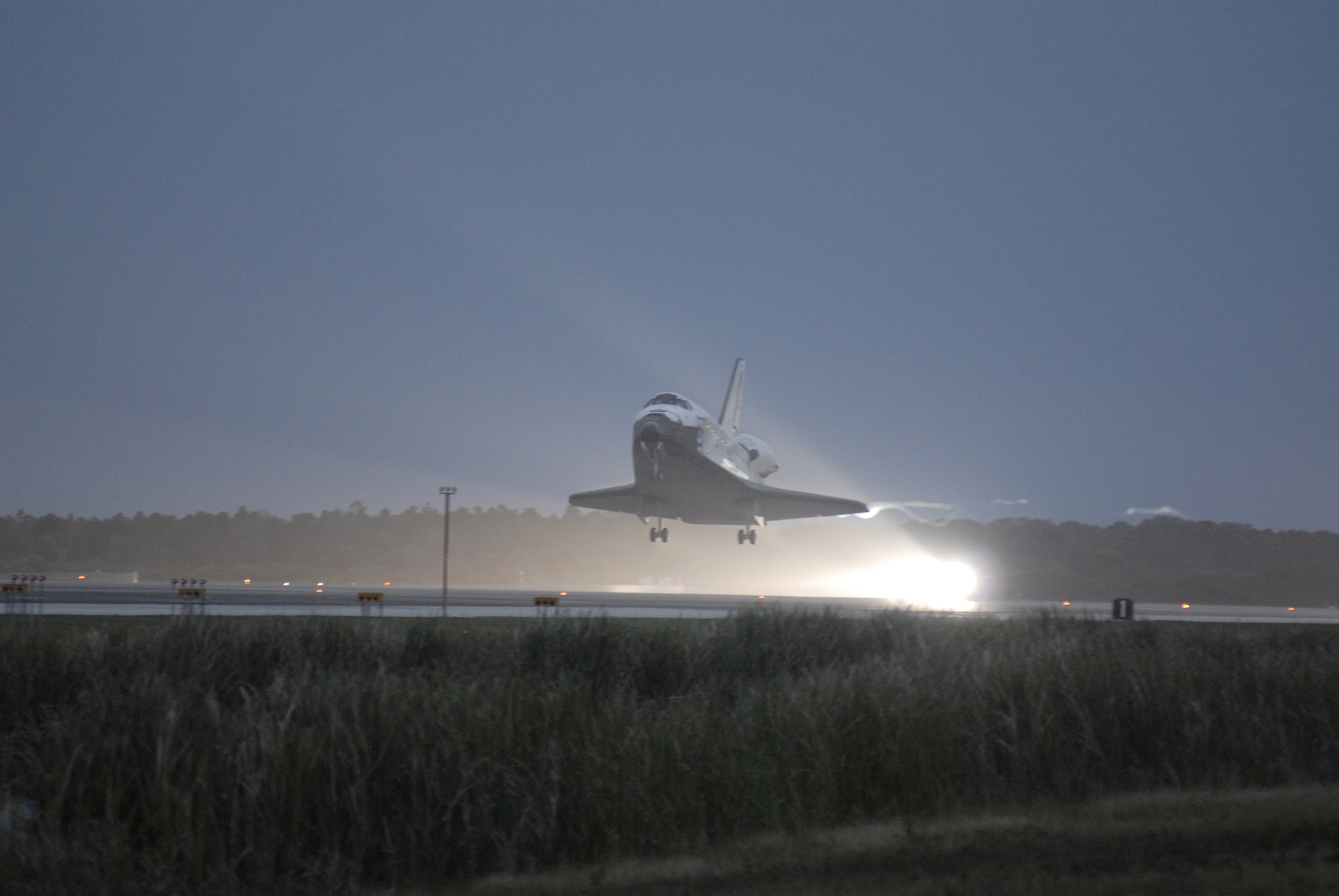
STS-116 landing at KSC.

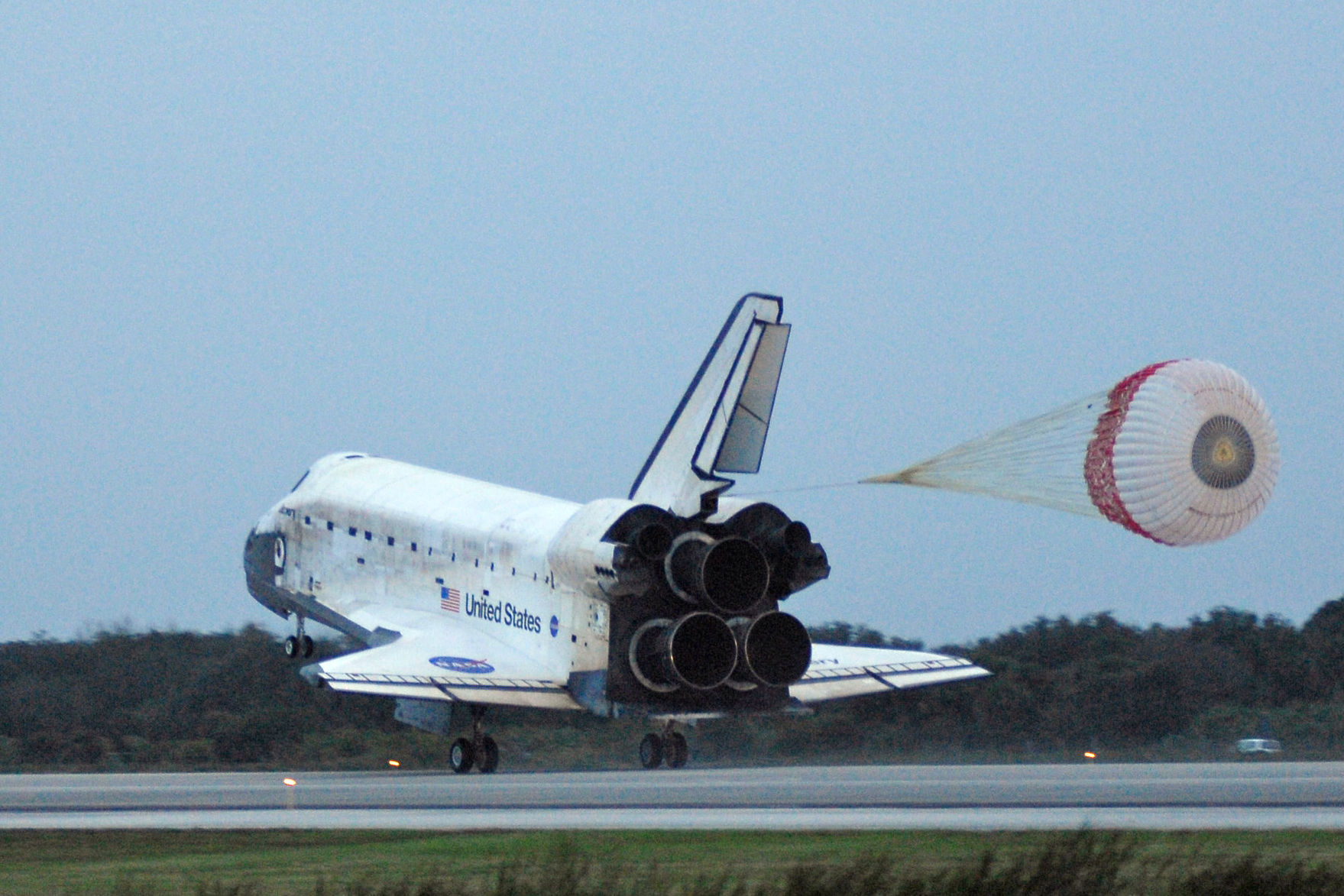
Discovery following the landing chute deployment.

Flight day 14 began for the astronauts at 12:17 UTC. Preparations for landing were complete. High cross-winds precluded a landing at Edwards Air Force Base while clouds and showers were an issue at Kennedy Space Center Shuttle Landing Facility on the first orbit. That combination raised the possibility of the first landing at White Sands Space Harbor since STS-3 in 1982. Had landing taken place at White Sands, it could have taken as long as 60 days to return the orbiter to Kennedy Space Center. The first landing opportunity at Kennedy Space Center was abandoned due to unfavorable weather conditions. However, at 21:00 UTC coordinates were sent to the shuttle to re-attempt a landing at Kennedy along runway 15, as the first contingency landing attempt at Edwards had been called off due to high crosswinds. The de-orbit burn for Kennedy occurred at 21:27 UTC, having been authorized at 21:23 UTC, and was finished at 21:31 UTC. Since the landing time coincided with the local sunset time 17:32 EST (22:32 UTC), the shuttle landing was not considered a night landing, as official rules for a night landing are sunset + 15 minutes; however, the xenon runway lighting system was in use. Discovery touched down 30 seconds before the expected time. Landing time at Kennedy was at 17:32 EST (22:32 UTC).

== Contingency planning ==
=== STS-301 ===
STS-301 was the designation given to the Contingency Shuttle Crew Support mission which would have been launched in the event Space Shuttle Atlantis had become disabled during STS-115. It was a modified version of the STS-116 mission, which would have involved the launch date being brought forward. If needed, it would have launched no earlier than November 11, 2006. The crew for this mission was a four-person subset of the full STS-116 crew:

- Mark Polansky – Commander and prime Remote Manipulator System (RMS) operator
- William Oefelein – Pilot and backup RMS operator
- Robert Curbeam – Mission specialist 1, Extravehicular 1
- Nicholas Patrick – Mission specialist 2, Extravehicular 2

=== STS-317 ===
In the event that Discovery suffered irreparable damage but made it to Earth orbit during STS-116, the crew would have taken refuge at the ISS and waited for a Contingency Shuttle Crew Support mission to launch. The mission would have been named STS-317 and would have been flown by the Space Shuttle Atlantis no earlier than February 21, 2007. The crew for this rescue mission would have been a subset of the full STS-117 crew.

== Wake-up calls ==
A tradition for NASA spaceflights since the days of Gemini, mission crews are played a special musical track at the start of each day in space. Each track is specially chosen, often by their family, and usually has special meaning to an individual member of the crew, or is applicable to their daily activities.

- Day 2: "Here Comes the Sun" by The Beatles; played for Commander Mark Polansky. MP3 WAV
- Day 3: "Beep Beep" by Louis Prima; played for Sunita Williams. MP3 WAV
- Day 4: "Waterloo" by ABBA; played for Christer Fuglesang. MP3 WAV
- Day 5: "Suavemente" by Elvis Crespo; played for Joan Higginbotham. MP3 WAV
- Day 6: "Under Pressure" by Queen & David Bowie; played for Robert Curbeam. MP3 WAV
- Day 7: "Low Rider" by War; played for William Oefelein. MP3 WAV
- Day 8: "Fanfare for the Common Man" by Aaron Copland performed by the London Philharmonic; played for Nicholas Patrick. MP3 WAV
- Day 9: "Blue Danube Waltz" by Johann Strauss performed by the Vienna Philharmonic; played for Christer Fuglesang. MP3 WAV
- Day 10: "Good Vibrations"; by The Beach Boys played for the entire Discovery crew. Chosen as part of the EVA involved shaking the solar array. The track was used as a wake up call on STS-85 when a Microgravity Vibration Isolation Mount was being tested. Curbeam was a mission specialist on that flight. It was his first trip into space. MP3 WAV
- Day 11: "Zamboni" by Gear Daddies; played for Pilot William Oefelein. MP3 WAV
- Day 12: "Say You'll Be Mine" by Christopher Cross; played for returning Expedition 14 crewmember Thomas Reiter. MP3 WAV
- Day 13: "The Road Less Traveled" by Joe Sample; played for Joan Higginbotham. MP3 WAV
- Day 14: "Home for the Holidays" by Perry Como; played for the entire Discovery crew. MP3 WAV

=== Extra-vehicular activity ===
EVA	Spacewalkers	Start (UTC)	End (UTC)	Duration	Mission
1	Robert Curbeam; Christer Fuglesang	December 12, 2006, 20:31	December 13, 2006, 03:07	6h 3m	Install P5 truss
2	Robert Curbeam; Christer Fuglesang	December 14, 2006, 19:41	December 15, 2006, 00:41	5h 0m	Rewiring station electrical system (circuits 2/3)
3	Robert Curbeam; Sunita Williams	December 16, 2006, 19:25	December 17, 2006, 02:57	7h 31m	Rewiring station electrical system (circuits 1/4)
4	Robert Curbeam; Christer Fuglesang	December 18, 2006, 19:00	December 19, 2006, 01:38	6h 38m	Retract port Solar Array Wing on P6 truss

== See also ==
- 2006 in spaceflight
- List of human spaceflights
- List of Space Shuttle missions
- Outline of space science
- Space Shuttle
