= STS-3xx =

Contingency Space Shuttle rescue mission designations

- Mission type: Crew rescue
- Mission duration: 4 days

Spacecraft properties
- Spacecraft type: Space Shuttle

Crew
- Crew size: 4
- Members: None assigned

Start of mission
- Launch date: Flight Day 45; Relative to original mission
- Launch site: Kennedy LC-39

End of mission
- Landing date: Flight Day 49

Orbital parameters
- Reference system: Geocentric
- Regime: Low Earth
- Inclination: 51.6 degrees

Docking with ISS
- Docking date: Flight Day 47
- Undocking date: Flight Day 48
- Time docked: < 1 day

Space Shuttle missions designated STS-3xx (officially called Launch On Need (LON) missions) were rescue missions which would have been mounted to rescue the crew of a Space Shuttle if their vehicle was damaged and deemed unable to make a successful reentry. Such a mission would have been flown if Mission Control determined that the heat shielding tiles and reinforced carbon-carbon panels of a currently flying orbiter were damaged beyond the repair capabilities of the available on-orbit repair methods. These missions were also referred to as Launch on Demand (LOD) and Contingency Shuttle Crew Support. The program was initiated following loss of Space Shuttle Columbia in 2003 during that Shuttle's investigation board. No mission of this type was launched before the Space Shuttle program ended in 2011.

== Procedure ==
The orbiter and four of the crew which were scheduled to fly the next planned mission would be retasked to the rescue mission. The planning and training processes for a rescue flight would have allowed NASA to launch the mission within a period of 40 days of its being called up. During that time, the damaged (or disabled) shuttle's crew would have to take refuge on the International Space Station (ISS). The ISS was able to support both crews for around 80 days, with oxygen supply being the limiting factor. Within NASA, this plan for maintaining the shuttle crew at the ISS was known as Contingency Shuttle Crew Support (CSCS) operations. Up to STS-121 all rescue missions were to be designated STS-300.

In the case of an abort to orbit, where the shuttle could have been unable to reach the ISS orbit and the thermal protection system inspections suggested that the shuttle could not have returned to Earth safely, the ISS may have been capable of descending to meet the shuttle. Such a procedure was known as a joint underspeed recovery.

Mission designations for STS-3xx flights
Flight	Rescue flight
STS-114 (Discovery)	STS-300 (Atlantis)
STS-121 (Discovery)	STS-300 (Atlantis)
STS-115 (Atlantis)	STS-301 (Discovery)
STS-116 (Discovery)	STS-317 (Atlantis)
STS-117 (Atlantis)	STS-318 (Endeavour)
STS-118 (Endeavour)	STS-322 (Discovery)
STS-120 (Discovery)	STS-320 (Atlantis)
STS-122 (Atlantis)	STS-323 (Discovery*)
STS-123 (Endeavour)	STS-324 (Discovery)
STS-124 (Discovery)	STS-326 (Endeavour)
STS-125 (Atlantis)	STS-400 (Endeavour)
STS-134 (Endeavour)	STS-335 (Atlantis)

* – originally scheduled to be Endeavour, changed to Discovery for contamination issues.

To save weight, and to allow the combined crews of both shuttles to return to Earth safely, many shortcuts would have had to be made, and the risks of launching another orbiter without resolving the failure which caused the previous orbiter to become disabled would have to have been faced.

== Flight hardware ==
A number of pieces of Launch on Need flight hardware were built in preparation for a rescue mission including:

- An extra three recumbent seats to be located in the aft middeck (ditch area)
- Two handholds located on the starboard wall of the ditch area
- Individual Cooling Units mounting provisions
- Seat 5 modification to properly secure in a recumbent position
- Mounting provisions for four additional Sky Genie egress devices (see picture)
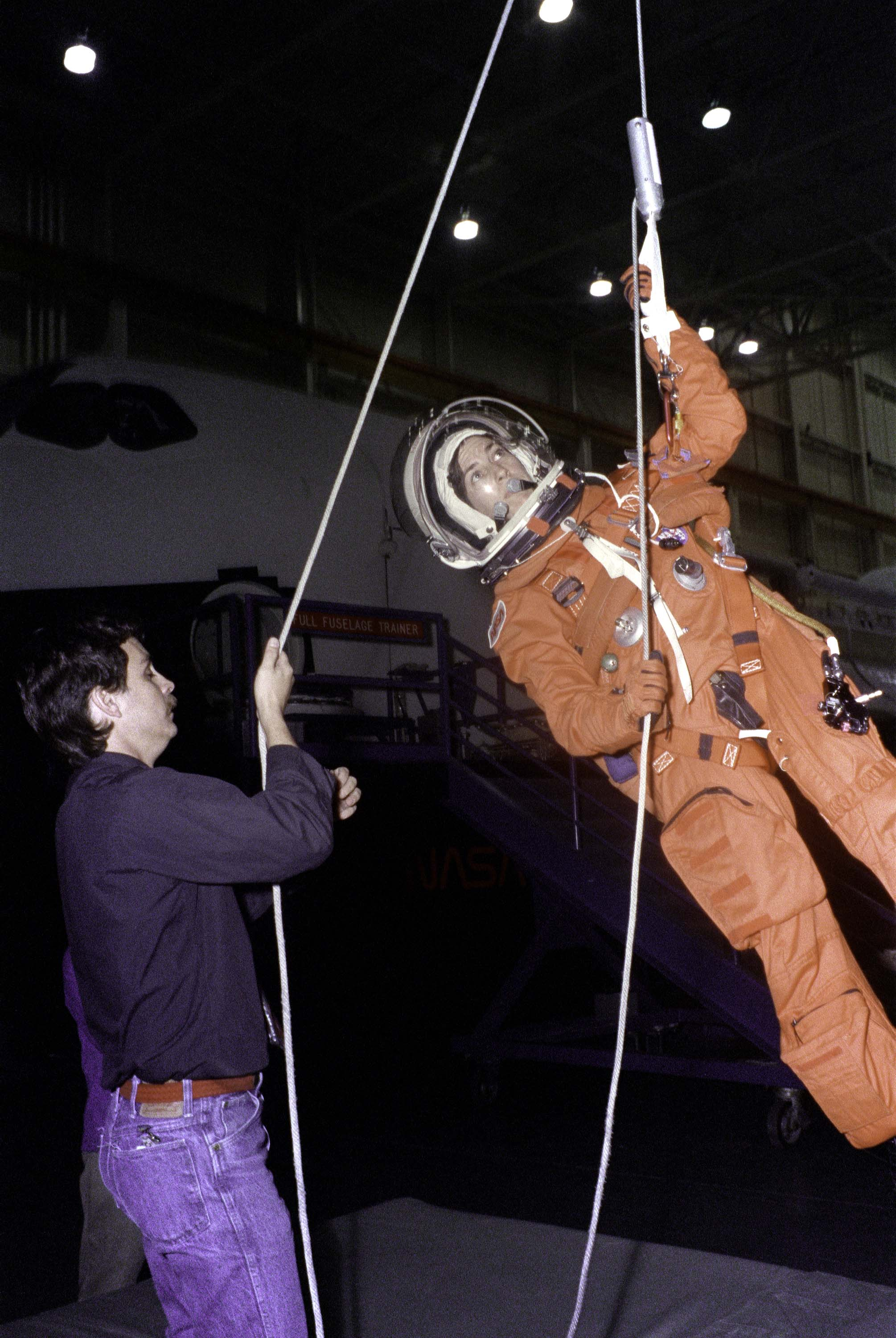
  Training with a Sky Genie egress device
- Escape Pole mounting provisions for three additional lanyards

== Remote Control Orbiter ==
The Remote Control Orbiter (RCO), also known as the Autonomous Orbiter Rapid Prototype (AORP), was a term used by NASA to describe a shuttle that could perform entry and landing without a human crew on board via remote control. NASA developed the RCO in-flight maintenance (IFM) cable to extend existing auto-land capabilities of the shuttle to allow remaining tasks to be completed from the ground. The purpose of the RCO IFM cable was to provide an electrical signal connection between the Ground Command Interface Logic (GCIL) and the flight deck panel switches. The cable is approximately 28 feet (8.5 m) long, weighs over 5 lb (2.3 kg), and has 16 connectors. With this system, signals could be sent from the Mission Control Center to the unmanned shuttle to control the following systems:

- Auxiliary Power Unit (APU) start and run
- Air Data Probe (ADP) deployment
- Main Landing Gear (MLG) arming and deployment
- Drag chute arming and deployment
- Fuel cell reactant valve closure
- Pitot tube clearing check

The RCO IFM cable first flew aboard STS-121 and was transferred to the ISS for storage during the mission. The cable remained aboard the ISS until the end of the Shuttle program. Prior to STS-121 the plan was for the damaged shuttle to be abandoned and allowed to burn up on reentry. The prime landing site for an RCO orbiter would be Vandenberg Air Force Base in California. Edwards Air Force Base, a site already used to support shuttle landings, was the prime RCO landing site for the first missions carrying the equipment; however Vandenberg was later selected as the prime site as it is nearer the coast, and the shuttle can be ditched in the Pacific should a problem develop that would make landing dangerous. White Sands Missile Range in New Mexico is a likely alternate site. A major consideration in determining the landing site would be the desire to perform a high-risk re-entry far away from populated areas. The flight resource book, and flight rules in force during STS-121 suggest that the damaged shuttle would reenter on a trajectory such that if it should break up, it would do so with debris landing in the South Pacific Ocean.

The Soviet Buran shuttle was also remotely controlled during its entire maiden flight without a crew aboard. Landing was carried out by an onboard, automatic system.

As of March 2011 the Boeing X-37 extended duration robotic spaceplane has demonstrated autonomous orbital flight, reentry and landing. The X-37 was originally intended for launch from the Shuttle payload bay, but following the Columbia disaster, it was launched in a shrouded configuration on an Atlas V.

== Sample timeline ==
Had a LON mission been required, a timeline would have been developed similar to the following:

- FD-10 A decision on the requirement for Contingency Shuttle Crew Support (CSCS) is expected by flight day 10 of a nominal mission.
- FD-10 Shortly after the need for CSCS operations a group C power down of the shuttle will take place.
- FD-11→21 During flight days 11–21 of the mission the shuttle will remain docked to the international space station (ISS) with the hatch open. Various items will be transferred between the shuttle and ISS.
- FD-21 Hatch closure will be conducted from the ISS side. The shuttle crew remains on the ISS, leaving the shuttle unmanned
- FD-21 Deorbit burn – burn occurs four hours after separation. Orbiter lands at Vandenberg Air Force Base under remote control from Houston. (Prior to STS-121, the payload bay doors would have been left open to promote vehicle breakup.)
- FD-45 Launch of rescue flight. 35 days from call-up to launch for the rescue flight is a best estimate of the minimum time it will take before a rescue flight is launched.
- FD-45→47 The rescue flight catches up with the ISS, conducting heat shield inspections en route.
- FD-47 The rescue flight docks with the station, on day three of its mission.
- FD-48 Shuttle crew enters the rescue orbiter. Vehicle with a crew complement of 11 undocks from ISS.
- FD-49 Rescue orbiter re-enters atmosphere over Indian or Pacific Ocean for landing at either Kennedy Space Center or Edwards Air Force Base. A Russian Progress resupply spacecraft is launched at later date to resupply ISS crew. ISS precautionary de-crew preparations begin.
- FD-58 De-crew ISS due to ECLSS O_{2} exhaustion in event Progress unable to perform resupply function.

== STS-335 ==
STS-134 was the last scheduled flight of the Shuttle program. Because no more were planned after this, a special mission was developed as STS-335 to act as the LON mission for this flight. This would have paired Atlantis with ET-122, which had been refurbished following damage by Hurricane Katrina. Since there would be no next mission, STS-335 would also carry a Multi-Purpose Logistics Module filled with supplies to replenish the station.

The Senate authorized STS-135 as a regular flight on 5 August 2010, followed by the House on 29 September 2010, and later signed by President Obama on 11 October 2010. However funding for the mission remained dependent on a subsequent appropriations bill.

Nonetheless NASA converted STS-335, the final Launch On Need mission, into an operational mission (STS-135) on 20 January 2011. On 13 February 2011, program managers told their workforce that STS-135 would fly "regardless" of the funding situation via a continuing resolution. Finally the U.S. government budget approved in mid-April 2011 called for $5.5 billion for NASA's space operations division, including the Space Shuttle and space station programs. According to NASA, the budget running through 30 September 2011 ended all concerns about funding the STS-135 mission.

With the successful completion of STS-134, STS-335 was rendered unnecessary and launch preparations for STS-135 continued as Atlantis neared LC-39A during its rollout as STS-134 landed at the nearby Shuttle Landing Facility.

For STS-135, no shuttle was available for a rescue mission. A different rescue plan was devised, involving the four crew members remaining aboard the International Space Station, and returning aboard Soyuz spacecraft one at a time over the next year. That contingency was not required.
