= STS-400 =

Space Shuttle contingency mission

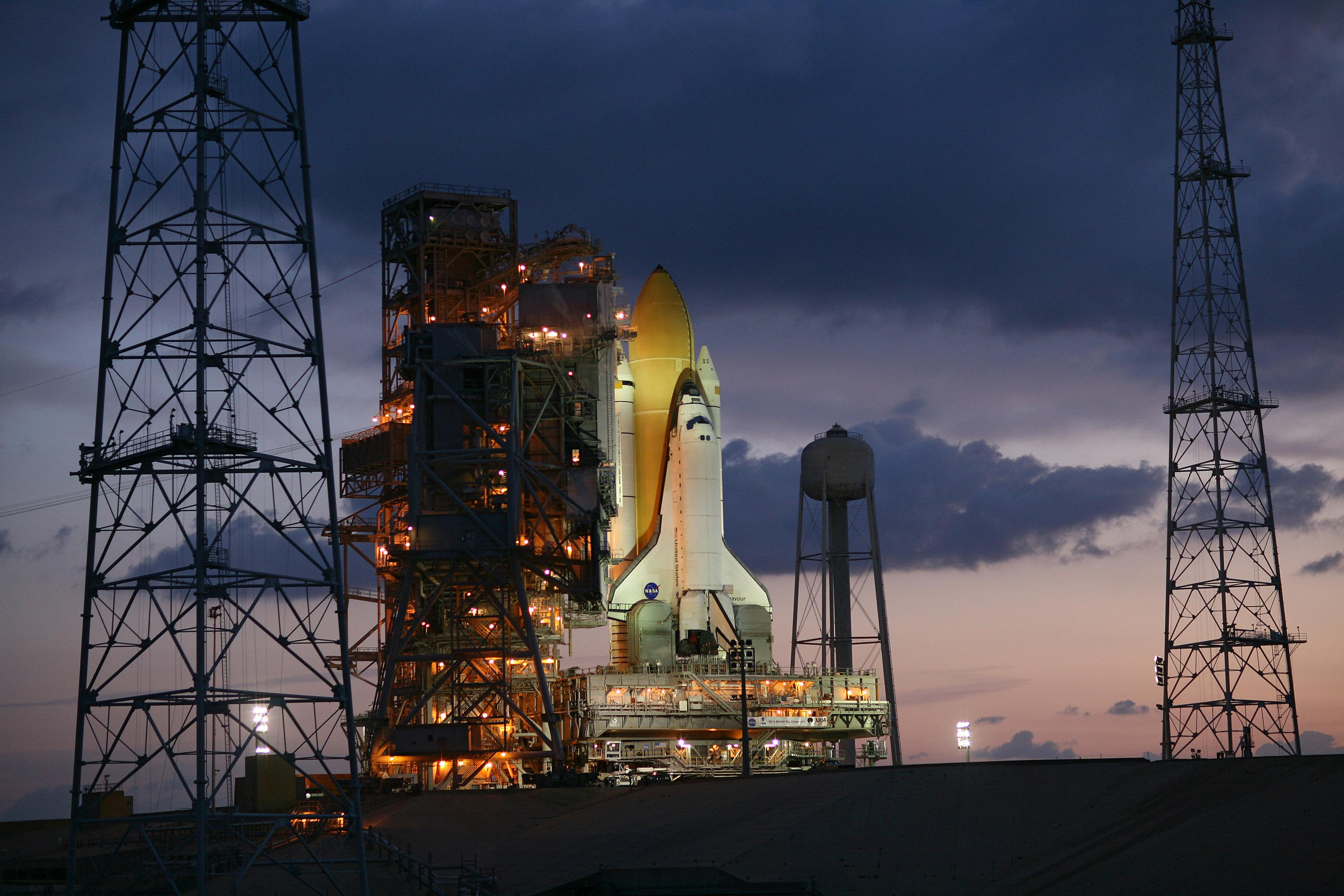
- Endeavour on standby at LC-39B, ready to rescue the crew of STS-125 if needed
- Mission type: Crew rescue
- Mission duration: 7 days

Spacecraft properties
- Spacecraft: Space Shuttle Endeavour

Crew
- Crew size: 4 up 11 down
- Members: Christopher Ferguson; Eric A. Boe; Robert S. Kimbrough; Stephen G. Bowen
- Landing: Scott D. Altman; Gregory C. Johnson; Michael T. Good; Megan McArthur; John M. Grunsfeld; Michael J. Massimino; Andrew J. Feustel

Start of mission
- Launch date: May 2009 (planned, not launched)
- Launch site: Kennedy, LC-39B

Orbital parameters
- Reference system: Geocentric
- Regime: Low Earth
- Inclination: 28.5 degrees
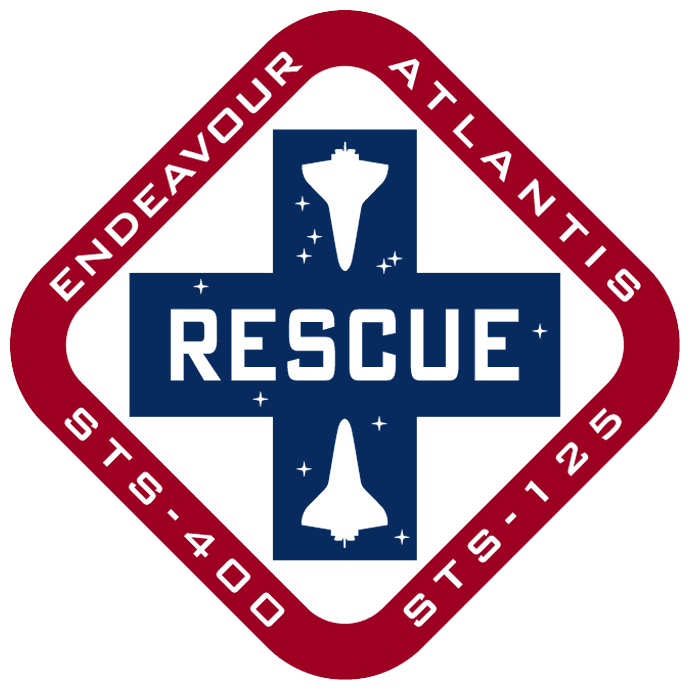
- "Unofficial" Mission Emblem

Comparison of International Space Station and Hubble Space Telescope orbits

STS-400 was the Space Shuttle contingency support (Launch On Need) flight that would have been launched using Space Shuttle Endeavour if a major problem occurred on Space Shuttle Atlantis during STS-125, the final Hubble Space Telescope servicing mission (HST SM-4).

Due to the much lower orbital inclination of the HST compared to the ISS, the shuttle crew would have been unable to use the International Space Station as a "safe haven", and NASA would not have been able to follow the usual plan of recovering the crew with another shuttle at a later date. Instead, NASA developed a plan to conduct a shuttle-to-shuttle rescue mission, similar to proposed rescue missions for pre-ISS flights. The rescue mission would have been launched only three days after call-up and as early as seven days after the launch of STS-125, since the crew of Atlantis would only have about three weeks of consumables after launch.

The mission was first rolled out in September 2008 to Launch Complex 39B two weeks after the STS-125 shuttle was rolled out to Launch Complex 39A, creating a rare scenario in which two shuttles were on launch pads at the same time. In October 2008, however, STS-125 was delayed and rolled back to the VAB.

Initially, STS-125 was retargeted for no earlier than February 2009. This changed the STS-400 vehicle from Endeavour to Discovery. The mission was redesignated STS-401 due to the swap from Endeavour to Discovery. STS-125 was then delayed further, allowing Discovery mission STS-119 to fly beforehand. This resulted in the rescue mission reverting to Endeavour, and the STS-400 designation being reinstated. In January, 2009, it was announced that NASA was evaluating conducting both launches from Complex 39A in order to avoid further delays to Ares I-X, which, at the time, was scheduled for launch from LC-39B in the September 2009 timeframe. It was planned that after the STS-125 mission in October 2008, Launch Complex 39B would undergo the conversion for use in Project Constellation for the Ares I-X rocket. Several of the members on the NASA mission management team said at the time (2009) that single-pad operations were possible, but the decision was made to use both pads.

== Crew ==
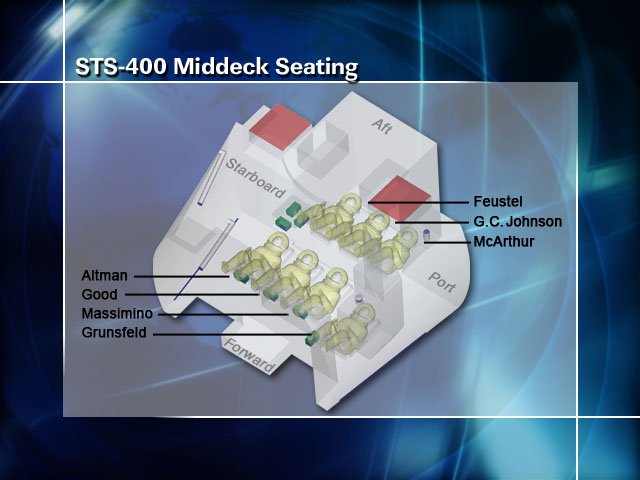
The seven members of STS-125 would have been seated on the middeck for reentry

The crew assigned to this mission was a subset of the STS-126 crew:

Position	Launching Astronaut	Landing Astronaut
Commander	Christopher Ferguson	
Pilot	Eric A. Boe	
Mission Specialist 1	Robert S. Kimbrough	
Mission Specialist 2 Flight Engineer	Stephen G. Bowen	
STS-125 Commander	None	Scott D. Altman
STS-125 Pilot	None	Gregory C. Johnson
STS-125 Mission Specialist 1	None	Michael T. Good
STS-125 Mission Specialist 2	None	Megan McArthur
STS-125 Mission Specialist 3	None	John M. Grunsfeld
STS-125 Mission Specialist 4	None	Michael J. Massimino
STS-125 Mission Specialist 5	None	Andrew J. Feustel

== Early mission plans ==
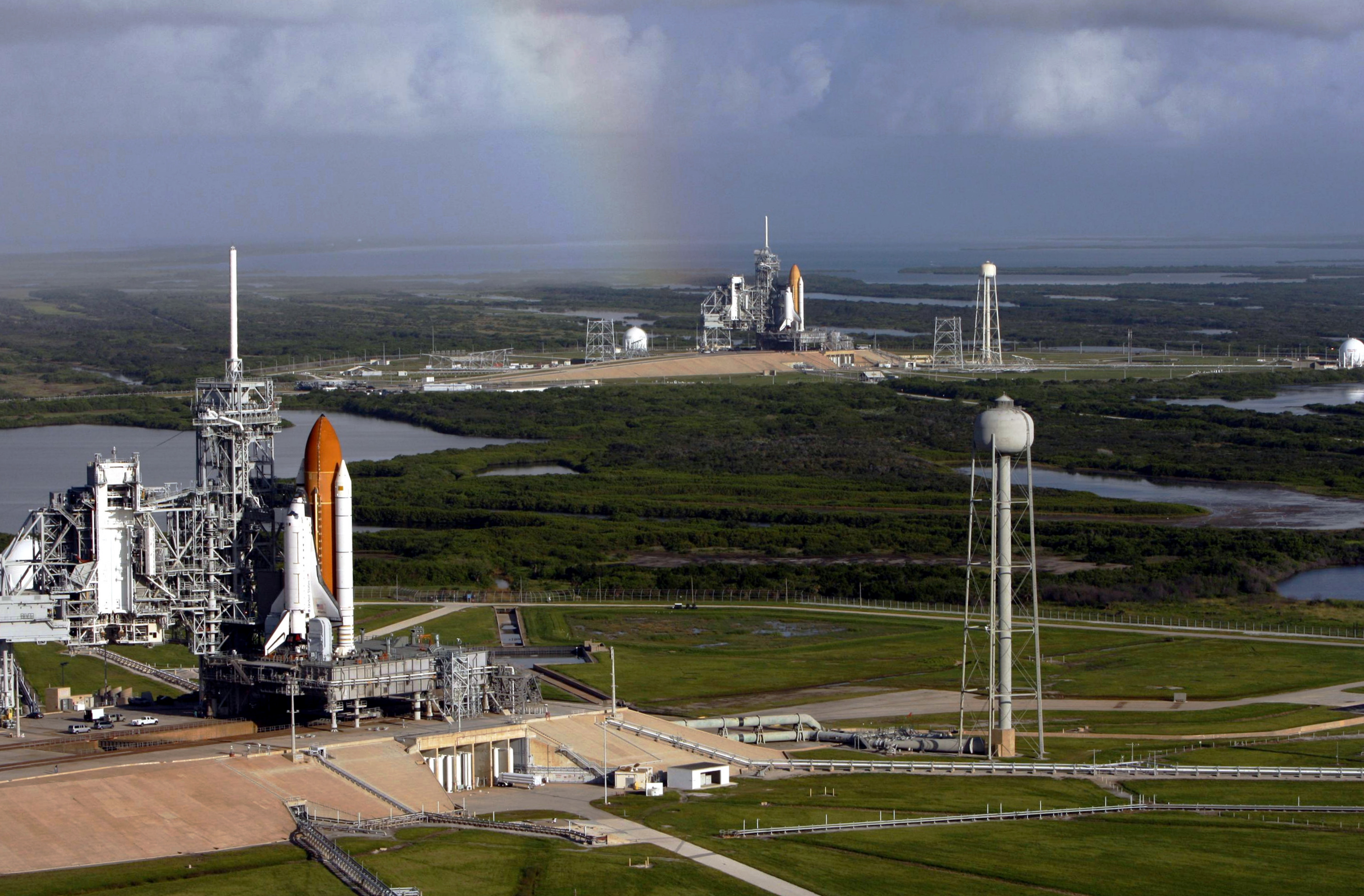
Atlantis (foreground) and Endeavour on LC-39A and LC-39B in 2008.

Three different concept mission plans were evaluated: The first would be to use a shuttle-to-shuttle docking, where the rescue shuttle docks with the damaged shuttle, by flying upside down and backwards, relative to the damaged shuttle. It was unclear whether this would be practical, as the forward structure of either orbiter could collide with the payload bay of the other, resulting in damage to both orbiters. The second option that was evaluated would be for the rescue orbiter to rendezvous with the damaged orbiter, and perform station-keeping while using its Remote Manipulator System (RMS) to transfer crew from the damaged orbiter. This mission plan would result in heavy fuel consumption. The third concept would be for the damaged orbiter to grapple the rescue orbiter using its RMS, eliminating the need for station-keeping. The rescue orbiter would then transfer crew using its RMS, as in the second option, and would be more fuel efficient than the station-keeping option.

The concept that was eventually decided upon was a modified version of the third concept. The rescue orbiter would use its RMS to grapple the end of the damaged orbiter's RMS.

== Preparations ==
Diagram showing one of the proposals for crew and equipment transfers during STS-400.

After its most recent mission (STS-123), Endeavour was taken to the Orbiter Processing Facility for routine maintenance. Following the maintenance, Endeavour was on stand-by for STS-326 which would have been flown in the case that STS-124 would not have been able to return to Earth safely. Stacking of the solid rocket boosters (SRB) began on 11 July 2008. One month later, the external tank arrived at KSC and was mated with the SRBs on 29 August 2008. Endeavour joined the stack on 12 September 2008 and was rolled out to Pad 39B one week later.

Since STS-126 launched before STS-125, Atlantis was rolled back to the VAB on 20 October, and Endeavour rolled around to Launch Pad 39A on 23 October. When it was time to launch STS-125, Atlantis rolled out to pad 39A.

== Mission plan ==
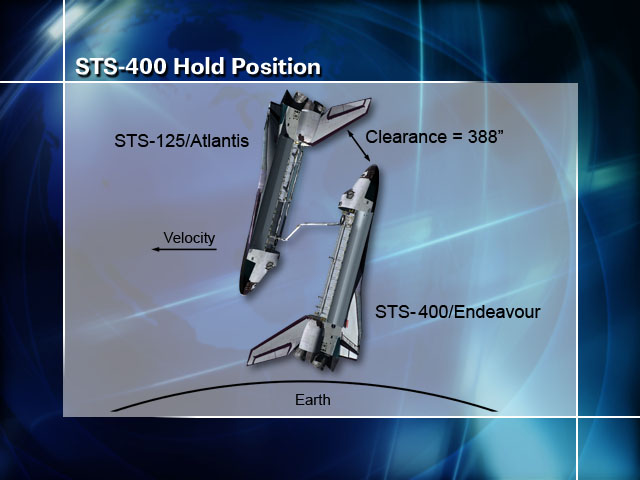
Endeavour would have grappled and held Atlantis

The mission would not have included the extended heatshield inspection normally performed on flight day two. Instead, an inspection would have been performed after the crew was rescued. On flight day two, Endeavour would have performed the rendezvous and grapple with Atlantis. On flight day three, the first EVA would have been performed. During the first EVA, Megan McArthur, Andrew Feustel and John Grunsfeld would have set up a tether between the airlocks. They would have also transferred a large size Extravehicular Mobility Unit (EMU) and, after McArthur had repressurized, transferred McArthur's EMU back to Atlantis. Afterwards they would have repressurized on Endeavour, ending flight day two activities.

The final two EVA were planned for flight day three. During the first, Grunsfeld would have depressurized on Endeavour in order to assist Gregory Johnson and Michael Massimino in transferring an EMU to Atlantis. He and Johnson would then repressurize on Endeavour, and Massimino would have gone back to Atlantis. He, along with Scott Altman and Michael Good would have taken the rest of the equipment and themselves to Endeavour during the final EVA. They would have been standing by in case the RMS system should malfunction. The damaged orbiter would have been commanded by the ground to deorbit and go through landing procedures over the Pacific, with the impact area being north of Hawaii. On flight day five, Endeavour would have had a full heat shield inspection, and land on flight day eight.

This mission could have marked the end of the Space Shuttle program, as it is considered unlikely that the program would have been able to continue with just two remaining orbiters, Discovery and Endeavour.

On Thursday, 21 May 2009, NASA officially released Endeavour from the rescue mission, freeing the orbiter to begin processing for STS-127. This also allowed NASA to continue processing LC-39B for the upcoming Ares I-X launch, as during the stand-down period, NASA installed a new lightning protection system, similar to those found on the Atlas V and Delta IV pads, to protect the newer, taller Ares I rocket from lightning strikes.

== Emblem and Crew Patches ==
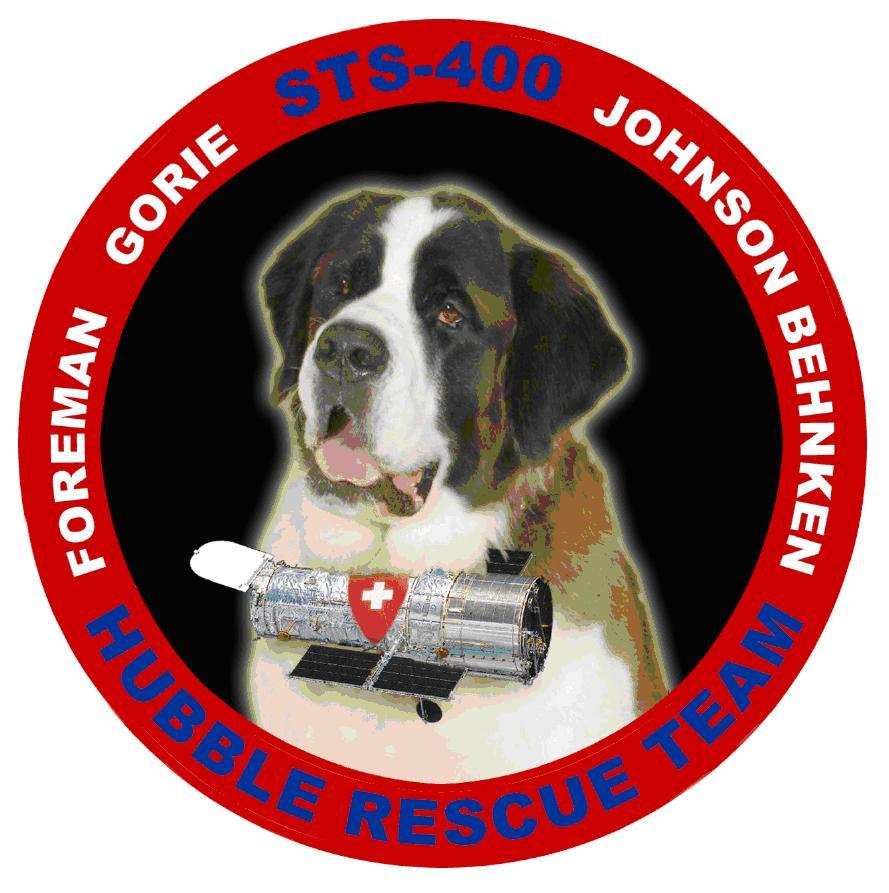
The first STS-400 flight crew's unofficial patch

As a contingency mission, STS-400 was not given official support by NASA for the production of a crew patch or emblem. However artwork was created for use by the mission team as an unofficial emblem by Mike Okuda, who also illustrated the official patch of STS-125.

As described by Paul F. Dye, Lead Flight Director of the mission, the emblem "adopts many of the elements seen in a rescue organization's patch - the square cross, bold letterers and border, and simple design. The idea is that the emblem instantly identifies the rescue organization in a crowd of others. In this case, the Shuttle outlines identify the purpose of our organization." In addition, the emblem contains 11 stars, symbolizing the combined 11 crew-members who would return to earth onboard STS-400.

The first flight crew assigned to the mission created another, more humorous design depicting a St. Bernard with its traditional barrel of brandy replaced by the Hubble Space Telescope. The final flight crew though were unsatisfied with this as a crew patch, and contacted longtime NASA artist Tim Gagnon about creating a new one, but never formally approved a design before the mission was scrubbed.

== See also ==
- STS-3xx
- STS-127
- Hubble Space Telescope
