= STS-121 =

2006 American crewed spaceflight to the ISS

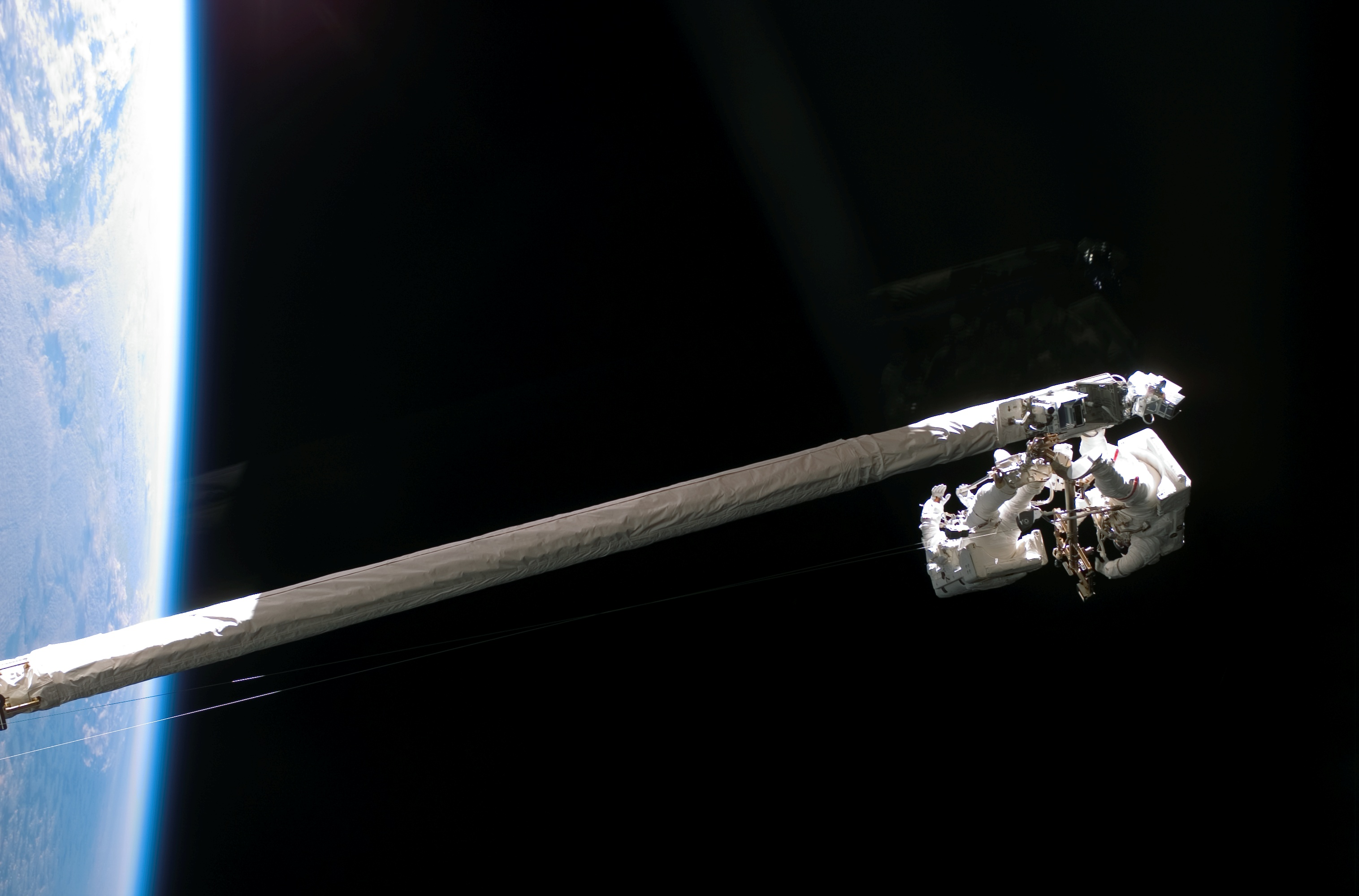
- Fossum and Sellers on the end of Discovery's Orbiter Boom Sensor System during the mission's first EVA
- Names: Space Transportation System-121
- Mission type: ISS logistics
- Operator: NASA
- COSPAR ID: 2006-028A
- SATCAT no.: 29251
- Mission duration: 12 days, 18 hours, 37 minutes, 54 seconds
- Distance travelled: 8,500,000 kilometres (5,300,000 mi)
- Orbits completed: 202

Spacecraft properties
- Spacecraft: Space Shuttle Discovery
- Launch mass: 121,092 kilograms (266,962 lb)

Crew
- Crew size: 7 up 6 down
- Members: Steven Lindsey; Mark Kelly; Michael E. Fossum; Lisa Nowak; Stephanie Wilson; Piers Sellers
- Launching: Thomas Reiter

Start of mission
- Launch date: July 4, 2006, 18:37:55 UTC
- Launch site: Kennedy, LC-39B

End of mission
- Landing date: July 17, 2006, 13:14:43 UTC
- Landing site: Kennedy, SLF Runway 15

Orbital parameters
- Reference system: Geocentric
- Regime: Low Earth
- Perigee altitude: 352.8 kilometres (219.2 mi)
- Apogee altitude: 354.2 kilometres (220.1 mi)
- Inclination: 51.6 degrees
- Period: 91.6 minutes

Docking with ISS
- Docking port: PMA-2 (Destiny forward)
- Docking date: 6 July 2006 14:52 UTC
- Undocking date: 15 July 2006 10:08 UTC
- Time docked: 8 days, 19 hours, 16 minutes
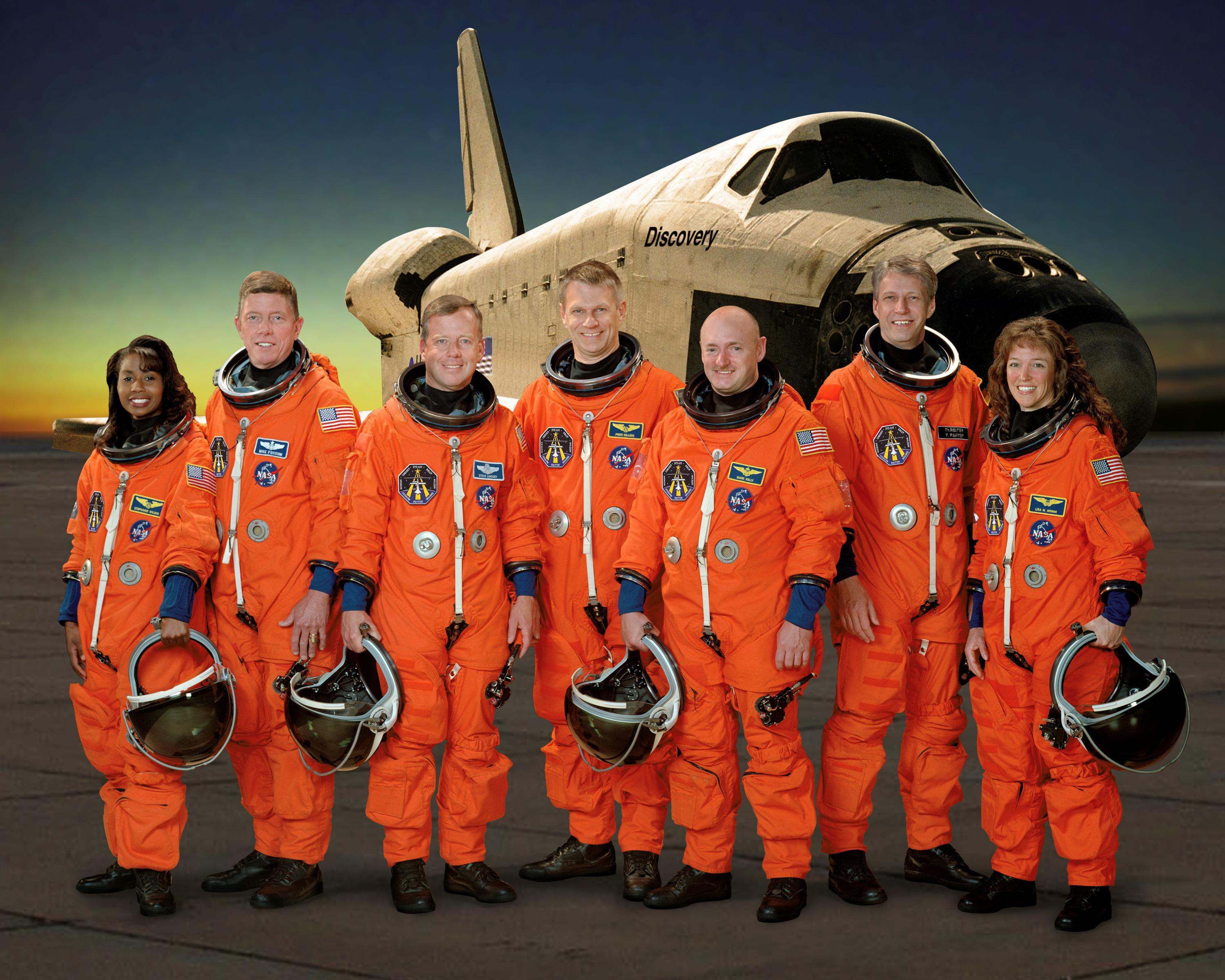
- (L-R) Wilson, Fossum, Lindsey, Sellers, Kelly, Reiter, Nowak. Space Shuttle program

STS-121 was a 2006 Space Shuttle mission to the International Space Station (ISS) flown by Space Shuttle Discovery on its 32nd flight. The main purposes of the mission were to test new safety and repair techniques introduced following the Columbia disaster of February 2003 as well as to deliver supplies, equipment, and European Space Agency (ESA) astronaut Thomas Reiter to the ISS. The European segment of the mission was called "Astrolab".

After two weather-related delays, the shuttle successfully launched on Tuesday, July 4, 2006, at 14:37:55 EDT. It was the first and only shuttle launch on the United States' Independence Day. The mission lasted for 13 days before landing at the Kennedy Space Center on July 17, 2006, at 09:14:43 EDT.

STS-121 was also designated the ISS Assembly Mission ULF 1.1. As the mission followed on from STS-114 in carrying out the recommendations made in response to the Columbia Accident Investigation Board report, it was considered a Return to Flight test mission. Its successful launch and landing led NASA to fully resume regular Space Shuttle launches in the construction of the ISS.

== Crew ==
| Position | Launching astronaut | Landing astronaut |
|---|---|---|
| Commander | (United States) Steven Lindsey; Fourth spaceflight | |
| Pilot | (United States) Mark Kelly; Second spaceflight | |
| Mission Specialist 1 | (United States) Michael E. Fossum; First spaceflight | |
| Mission Specialist 2 Flight Engineer | (United States) Lisa Nowak; Only spaceflight | |
| Mission Specialist 3 | (United States) Stephanie Wilson; First spaceflight | |
| Mission Specialist 4 | (United States) Piers Sellers; Second spaceflight | |
| Mission Specialist 5 | (Germany) Thomas Reiter, ESA; Expedition 13; Second and last spaceflight ISS Flight Engineer | None |

=== Crew notes ===
Thomas Reiter's position was previously planned to be filled by Sergey Volkov (Russia) before the launch of STS-121 was postponed until July 2006.

British-born astronaut Piers Sellers replaced Carlos Noriega who was originally scheduled to be on the STS-121 mission NASA announced on Thursday, July 15, 2004. This was due to an undisclosed, temporary medical condition.

The transfer of Reiter to the ISS returned the station to a three crew member staffing level. After the loss of Columbia and the grounding of the Shuttle fleet, only two people had been residing on the ISS.

== Shuttle hardware ==
- External Tank: ET-119
- Solid Rocket Boosters: BI-126 & RSRM-93
- SSMEs: s/n 2045, 2051, 2056
- OMS engines: LP-01/35 RP-03/33

=== Crew seat assignments ===
| Seat | Launch | Landing | Seats 1–4 are on the flight deck. Seats 5–7 are on the mid-deck. |
| 1 | Lindsey | | Seats 1–4 are on the flight deck. Seats 5–7 are on the mid-deck. |
| 2 | Kelly | | Seats 1–4 are on the flight deck. Seats 5–7 are on the mid-deck. |
| 3 | Fossum | Wilson | Seats 1–4 are on the flight deck. Seats 5–7 are on the mid-deck. |
| 4 | Nowak | | Seats 1–4 are on the flight deck. Seats 5–7 are on the mid-deck. |
| 5 | Wilson | Fossum | Seats 1–4 are on the flight deck. Seats 5–7 are on the mid-deck. |
| 6 | Sellers | | Seats 1–4 are on the flight deck. Seats 5–7 are on the mid-deck. |
| 7 | Reiter | Unused | Seats 1–4 are on the flight deck. Seats 5–7 are on the mid-deck. |

== Mission background ==
During the STS-121 mission to the International Space Station (ISS), the crew of Space Shuttle Discovery continued to test new equipment and procedures for the inspection and repair of the thermal protection system that is designed to increase the safety of the Space Shuttles. It also delivered more supplies and cargo for future ISS expansion.

After the Columbia accident, NASA decided that two test flights would be required and that activities that were originally assigned to STS-114 would need to be divided into two missions because of the addition of post-Columbia safety tests. Before the accident, Columbia had been assigned to missions STS-118 and STS-121. The STS-118 mission, also an International Space Station flight, was at first reassigned to Discovery, but was later assigned to Space Shuttle Endeavour.

The STS-121 mission was originally to have sent Columbia to service the Hubble Space Telescope. However, that servicing mission was given another designation on the manifest before the disaster and the designation of STS-121 once again became available. Since STS-115 through STS-120 were already delegated to existing missions, NASA selected the lowest available mission designation for the second test flight. Hence, the mission following STS-114 is STS-121.

The STS-121 test flight mission was originally to be flown aboard Atlantis in September 2005, after Discovery flew STS-114, but a problem with the landing gear of Atlantis moved Discovery ahead to fly STS-121. After the return of Discovery to California following the completion of STS-114, scheduling again changed. Atlantis was moved up to fly the STS-115 mission (whose launch was planned for August 2006) and Discovery was to fly the STS-121 mission as originally planned. The launch of the STS-121 mission was delayed until July 2006 as well, due to an unresolved foam debris and the Engine Cut Off (ECO) sensor issue from STS-114.

On May 12, 2006, Discovery was moved from the Orbiter Processing Facility to the Vehicle Assembly Building, where it was mated to its External Tank and SRBs. Rollout to Pad 39B occurred on May 19, 2006, ahead of the planned launch, during the July 2006 launch window, which existed for about ten minutes each day between July 1 and 19.

== Equipment delivered to the ISS ==
Key items delivered, as part of over 2 tons of cargo included: Multi-Purpose Logistics Module (MPLM) Leonardo on its 4th flight, 7th MPLM overall, carrying:

- −80 °C Freezer

This freezer is known as the Minus Eighty Degree Laboratory Freezer for ISS (MELFI). The French-built unit comprises four independent drawers which can be set to operate at different temperatures. Initially, temperatures of −80, −26, and 4 °C (−112, −15, and 39 °F) will be used during in-orbit ISS operations. Both reagents and samples will be stored in the freezer. As well as storage, the freezer is designed to be used to transport samples to and from the ISS in a temperature controlled environment. The total capacity of the unit is 300 litres (79 US gal).

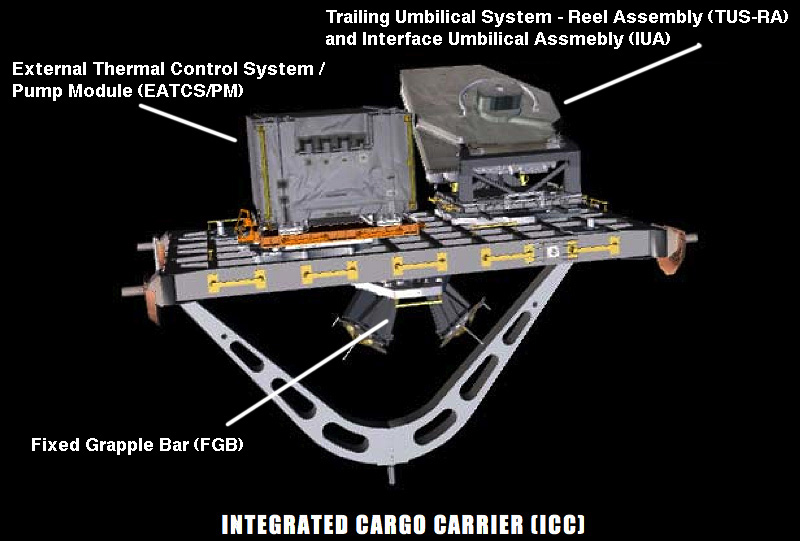
ICC STS-121

- The European Modular Cultivation System (EMCS) for biological experiments.

This consists of a gas tight incubator in which there are two centrifuges, each able to carry four experimental cartridges. Two "Ground controls"—exact copies of the equipment and experiments—will be run on the ground, one in Europe and one at NASA's Ames Research Center.

- New oxygen generation system

This device is considered a test for an equipment design with potential for use on proposed future long durations to the Moon and Mars. The system will initially run below its maximum capacity, though it is designed for enabling the ISS to support a crew of six in the future. It will supplement the Russian-built Elektron system operating in the Zvezda module.

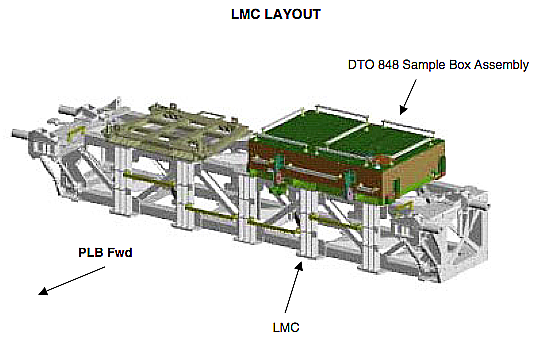
LMC with TPS Repair Box

- New cycling machine for the ISS crew

A Danish built device, the Cycle Ergometer with Vibration Isolation System (CEVIS)

- Replacement common cabin air assembly heat exchanger used to control the internal air temperature of the ISS.

All of the above equipment was installed in the Destiny Laboratory Module.

Also carried in the payload bay was an Integrated Cargo Carrier with the Trailing Umbilical System (TUS) for the Mobile Transporter (returning old one), an EATCS/Pump Module (PM), two Fixed Grapple Bars for PM and TUS relocation during EVA and an LMC carrying the DTO-848 TPS Repair Box.

== Timeline ==
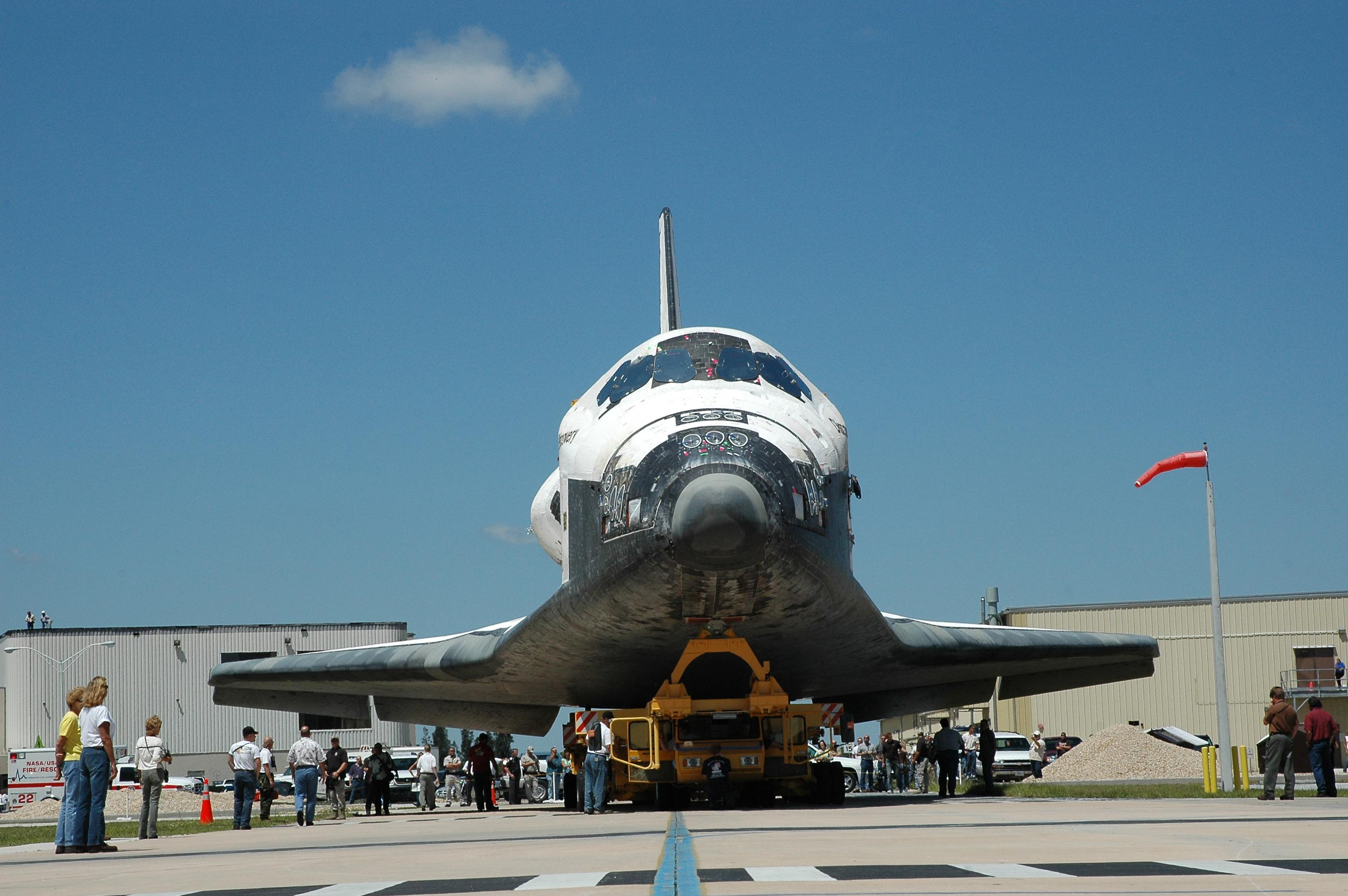
Discovery is moved from the OPF to VAB for STS-121.

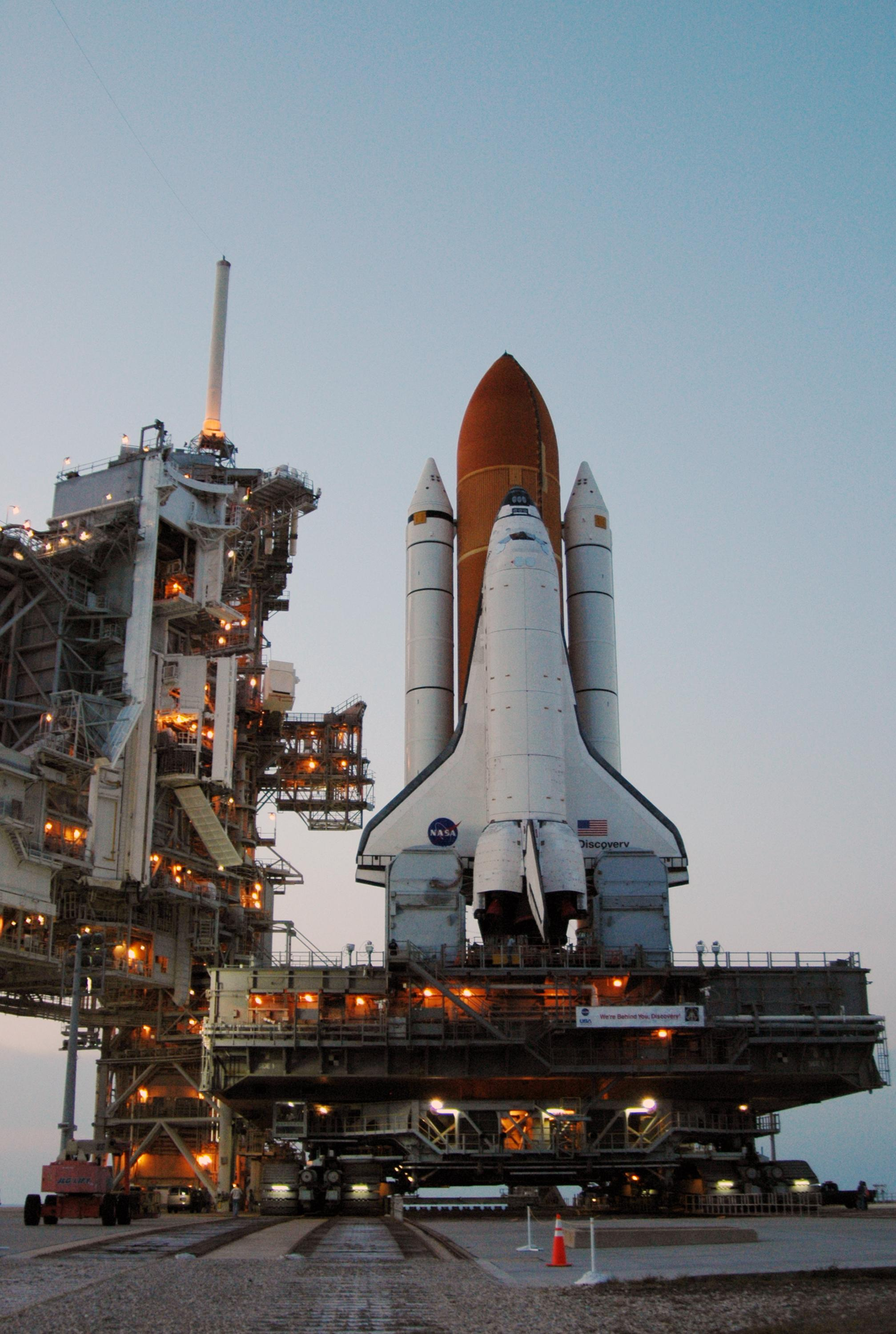
Discovery arrives at the launch pad, for STS-121.

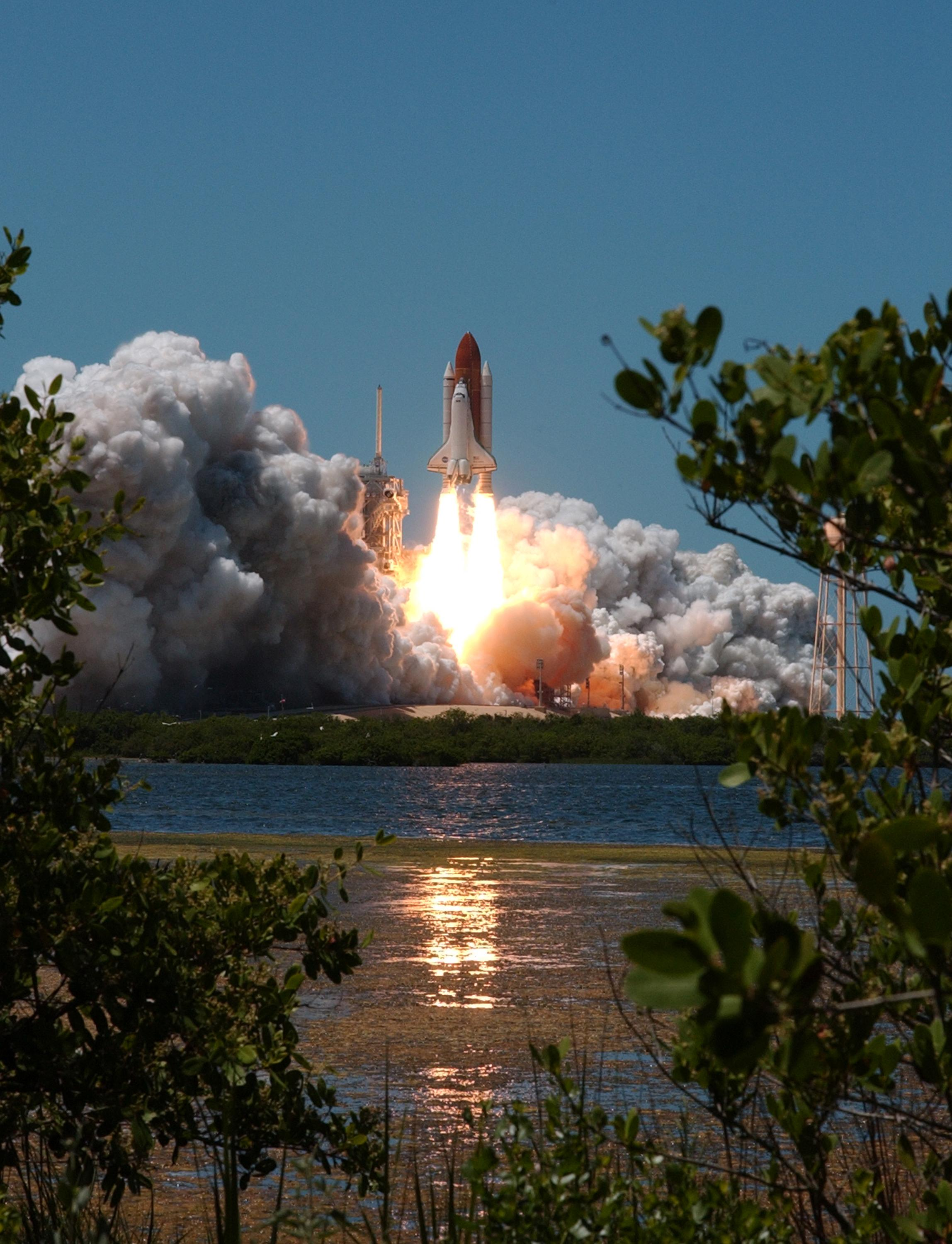
Launch of STS-121 on July 4, 2006

The shuttle was docked to the ISS for the majority of the flight. For much of the time the shuttle was at the ISS the Multi-Purpose Logistics Module Leonardo was mated and accessible to the crew for the transfer of equipment, supplies, returned experiments and trash. Three spacewalks were carried out on the mission, the third was dependent on sufficient consumables being available and two alternate timelines were planned, with and without the final spacewalk. There were also additional "Get Ahead" tasks planned for the crew to do at the ISS if they found themselves with more time than planned, one such get ahead task was completed on EVA 2. The crew were able to take the majority of one day off, during which they explored the ISS, took photographs, and conducted press interviews.

| Attempt | Planned | Result | Turnaround | Reason | Decision point | Weather go (%) | Notes |
|---|---|---|---|---|---|---|---|
| 1 | 1 Jul 2006, 3:48:38 pm | Scrubbed | — | Weather | 1 Jul 2006, 3:41 pm (T−00:09:00 hold) | 40% | Cloud cover and the threat of lightning. |
| 2 | 2 Jul 2006, 3:26:09 pm | Scrubbed | 0 days 23 hours 38 minutes | Weather | 2 Jul 2006, 1:14 pm | 30% | Cloud cover. |
| 3 | 4 Jul 2006, 2:37:55 pm | Success | 1 day 23 hours 12 minutes | | | 80% | |

=== July 1 (Launch attempt 1) ===
Events throughout the day went according to plan, one exception being an abnormal temperature reading on thruster L5L (see Pre-launch concerns). The launch window was from 3:48:41 to 3:53:02 p.m. At 3:42, while in the T−9 built-in hold, mission control decided to postpone launch because anvil (thunderstorm) clouds and lightning were detected within 20 miles (32 km) of the launch area and path. Launch was rescheduled for July 2 at 3:26 p.m. STS-121 was the first launch during which NASA took special precautions to deter vultures, particularly the local turkey vulture, from flying over the area. Efforts included the swift removal of roadkill and other dead animals from areas around the launch site. This followed a near miss during STS-114.

=== July 2 (Launch attempt 2) ===
Again, the countdown continued according to schedule with a launch time of 3:26 p.m. At 9:30 am on July 2, the NASA launch blog reported that the "shuttle weather officer forecasts a 70-percent chance of weather prohibiting a launch this afternoon due to thunderstorms and anvil clouds. There is a 60-percent chance of weather prohibiting launch should there be a 24-hour turnaround, and a 40-percent chance with a 48-hour delay. If we scrub today due to weather, mission managers will meet later to decide if they want to make a third consecutive launch attempt or stand down for one day and try again on Tuesday."

At 1:14 p.m., the launch director made a final decision to scrub again due to unfavorable weather conditions. The next launch attempt was scheduled for around 2:38 p.m. on July 4.

=== July 3 (No launch attempt) ===
The shuttle's fuel cells were replenished to improve the chances of having enough electrical power on orbit to enable the third planned space walk to take place.

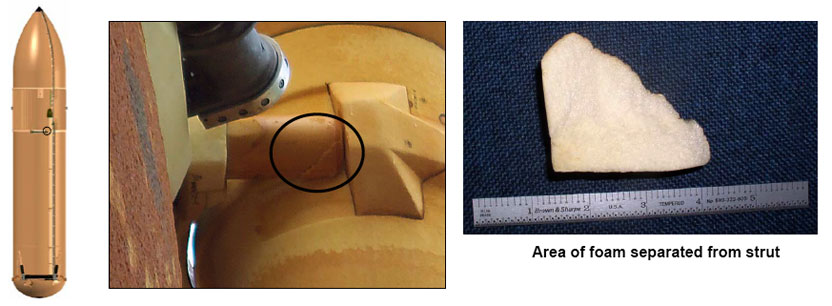
Images, from left to right showing 1. The external fuel tank area showing the location of the liquid oxygen feedline bracket. 2. Detail of the bracket showing cracked and missing foam. 3. Fragment of foam that fell off. Photo credit: NASA

Cracks and a region where a piece of foam had come off were discovered in the insulation on the upper part of the external fuel tanks. The foam came off a bracket which held an oxygen line in place. The fragment that fell off weighed 0.0056 pounds (2.6 grams) and, according to NASA, would not be big enough to damage the shuttle if it were to come off during flight. The thermal stresses of repeated filling and emptying the fuel tank with the cryogenic fuel are known to cause a degree of damage to the insulation foam.

=== July 4 (Launch and flight day 1) ===
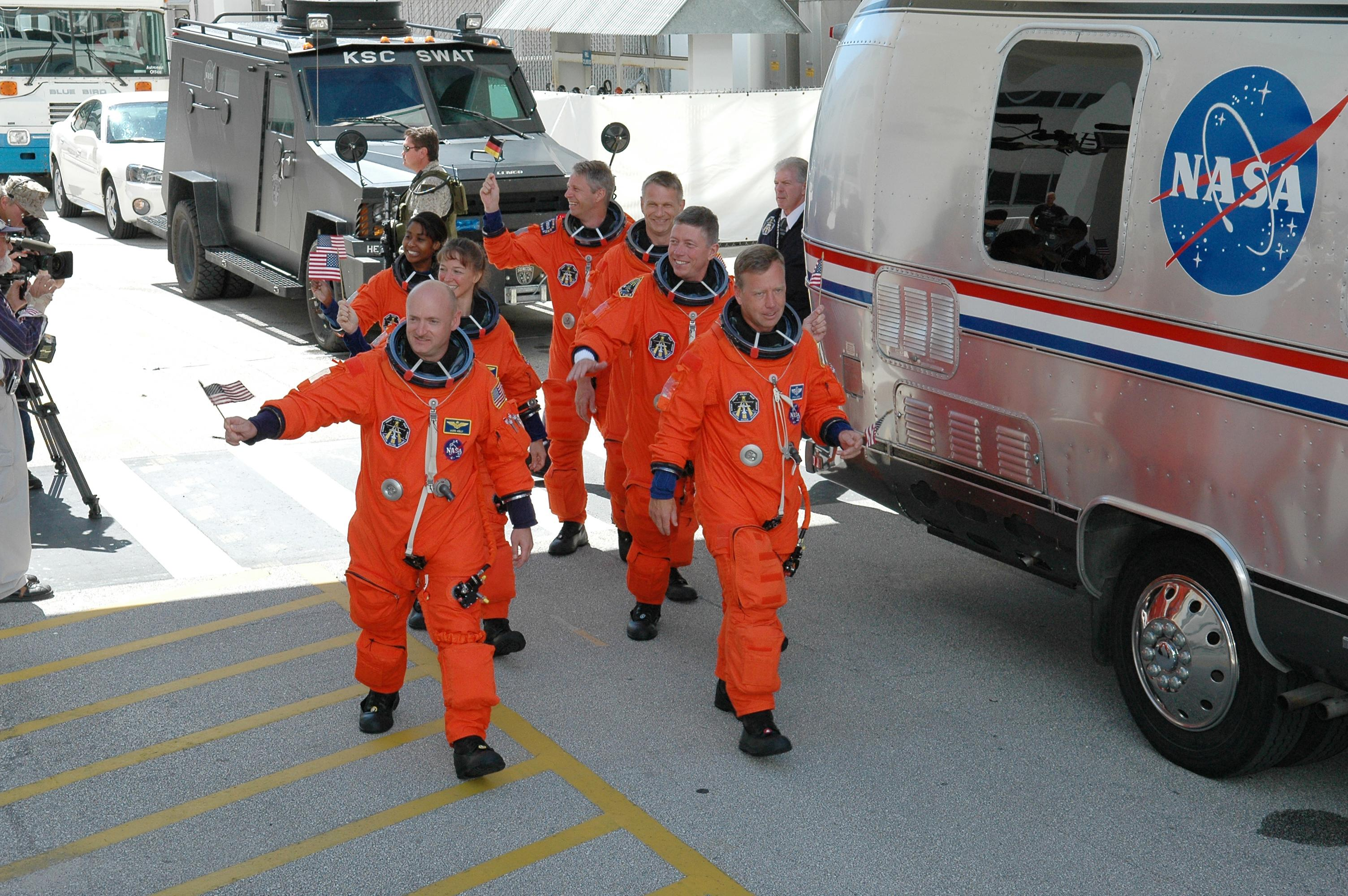
On launch day, the STS-121 crew walks to the traditional AstroVan en route to the launch pad

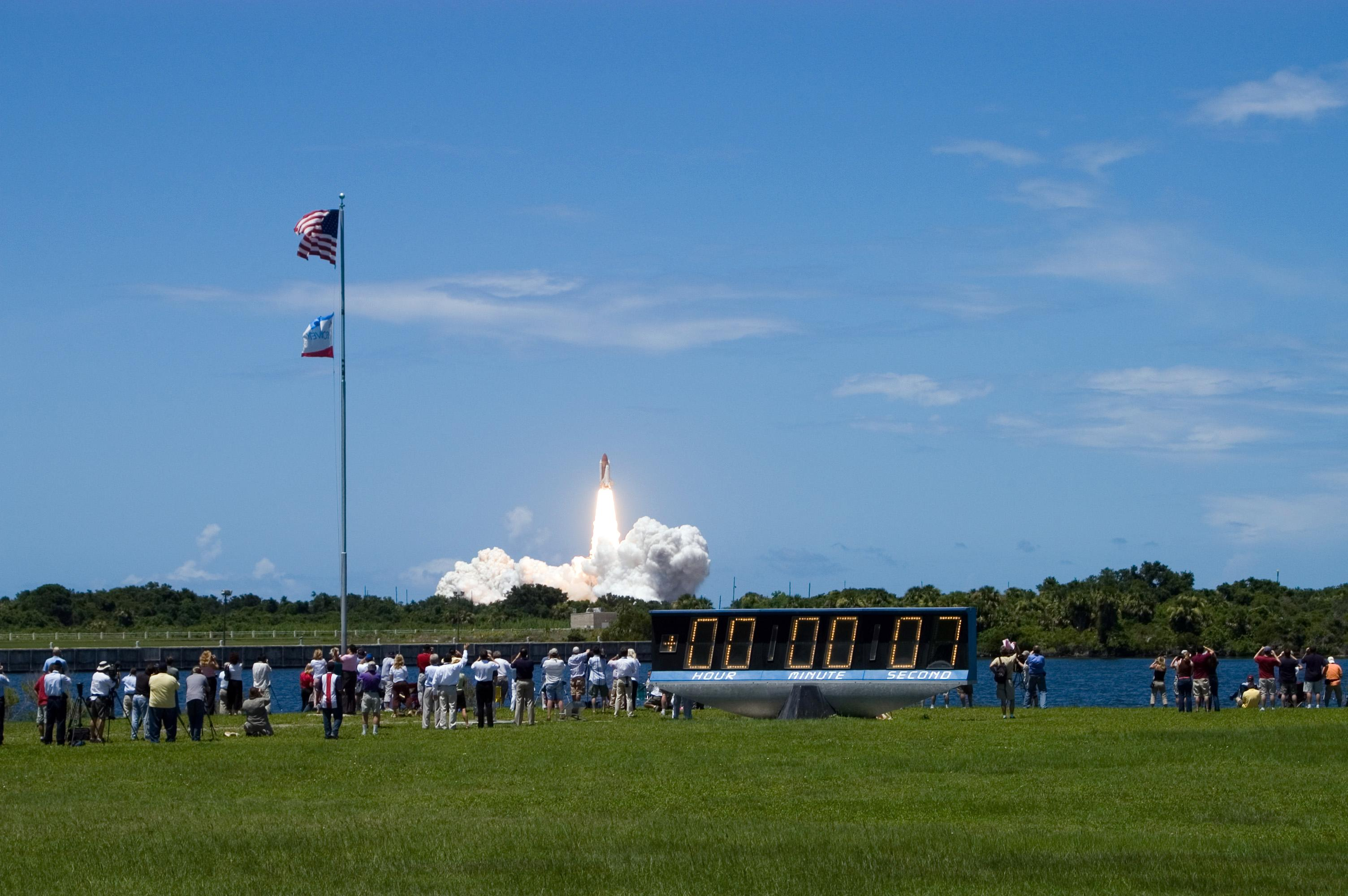
The launch of STS-121 viewed from the press site

Video of the launch of STS-121.

At 8:35 a.m. the backup circuit breaker controlling the primary heaters on the segment joints of both solid rocket boosters was noticed to have failed. Consideration was given to a repair on the pad. However, this was not done as the heaters are only used in colder weather, and the primary heater was functional.

For the third launch attempt, there was only a 20% chance of weather preventing launch according to NASA.

At 2:37:55 PM Eastern Daylight Time, Space Shuttle Discovery launched from the Kennedy Space Center at Cape Canaveral, Florida. This was the third attempt at launch. It was also the first (and only) US Space Shuttle to launch on the United States' Independence Day.

During and after launch much attention was paid to monitoring the external tank for the loss of insulation foam. The shuttle was equipped with a number of new cameras, and video was also taken from spotter planes. Each solid rocket booster contained three cameras - one to monitor the separation, and two focused on the leading edge. The video from these was not to be broadcast, but recorded for later retrieval from the solid rocket boosters. A further camera was placed on the external tank, as during STS-114, to broadcast live images on NASA TV during launch. The first thing two of the crew from the mid-deck did when the main engines cut out was leave their seats to take photographs and video of the external tank. One of the factors that was potentially affecting the choice of day within the launch window was the lighting conditions for this imagery, as the sun's slightly different angle on the different days affected the location of shadows on the external tank. However, the day to day difference in lighting was determined to be relatively unimportant, particularly as the lighting conditions depended to a great degree on a more unpredictable factor — the degree to which the external tank tumbles on separation.

During the launch, NASA TV broadcast a view from the external tank camera mounted between the Shuttle and the external tank. Unlike the previous two missions, no foam breakage or foam pieces were easily seen falling off the tank. However, upon close inspection of the many cameras covering the launch NASA has revealed several small pieces of debris were seen jetting away from the tank. Generally, though, these were seen after the time NASA was most concerned about.

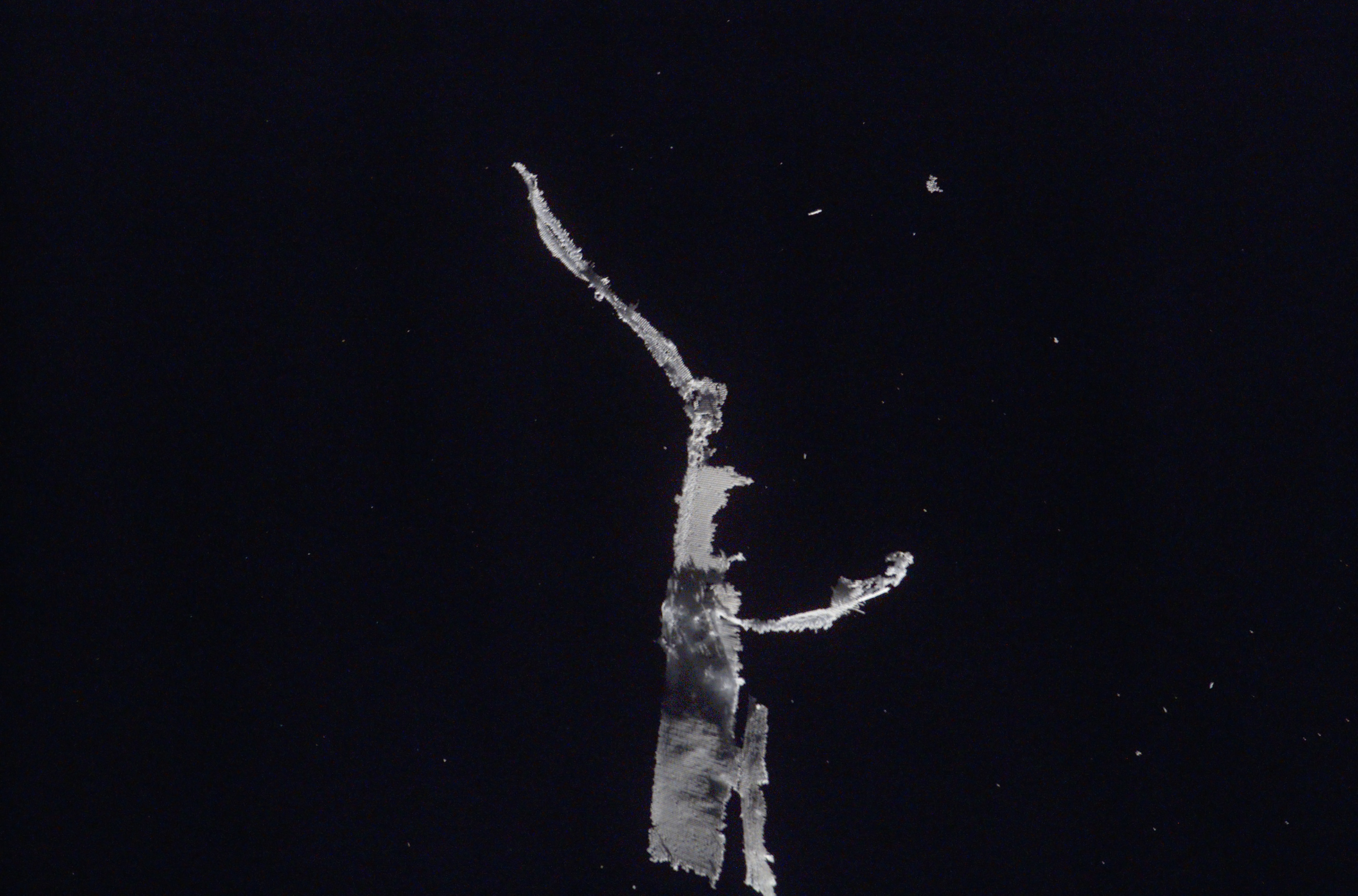
A piece of ice videoed by Michael Fossum from STS-121.

About 23 minutes into the flight, further debris was observed floating beside the orbiter as reported by Mission Specialist Michael Fossum. His transmission was broadcast live on NASA TV. Fossum initially described the debris as a 4–5-foot-long piece (1.2–1.5 m) with straps attached, a description which would fit a thermal protection system blanket. Such a blanket was noted to be flapping on the previous mission, STS-114, but was not of concern as it protects a section of the vehicle which does not get particularly hot. Analysis of video images on the ground has indicated that the debris observed was strips of ice formed on the outside of an engine nozzle, which sublimated and disintegrated during observation. Very similar ice formations were seen on earlier missions.

Video analysis also revealed a tile shim which came out during main engine start.

The orbital maneuvering system thruster in which a heater failed prior to launch (see Pre-launch concerns) was warmed by pointing it at the Sun; thus it was possible to be used during ISS rendezvous docking operations.

=== July 5 (flight day 2) ===
En route to the ISS, the 50-foot (15 m)-long Orbiter Boom Sensor System (OBSS) tipped with two types of lasers and a high-resolution television camera was used to inspect the underside of the shuttle for damage. Particular attention was paid to the leading edges of the shuttle's wings.

The post mission management team briefing after flight day 2 revealed that the inspections had found that a gap filler was protruding on the port side lower wing, not a location of particular concern. The gap filler was not from an area which has been modified since STS-114; it had been with the vehicle since 1982. The height and location of the gap filler was to be investigated further and, if necessary, dealt with using the procedure established and proven by STS-114, during a spacewalk.

An analysis of the inspections revealed the presence of bird droppings on the leading edge of the right wing. The launch director has said he saw droppings in that location before launch. During the crew press conference on landing day the crew joked about the bird droppings indicating that they were still present on the orbiter though rather charred.

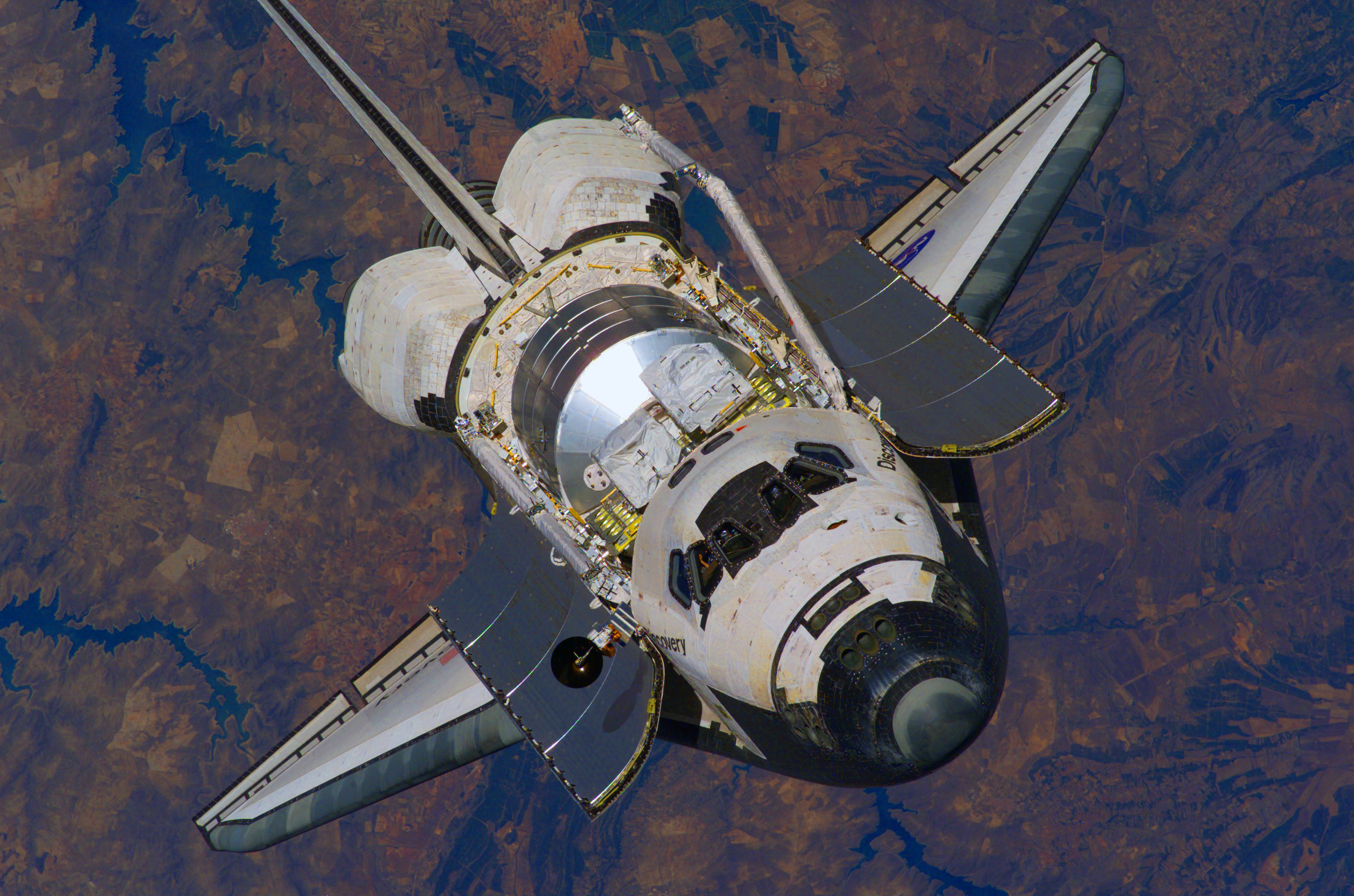
The Discovery orbiter approaches the ISS on STS-121

=== July 6 (flight day 3) ===
Rendezvous with the ISS. The shuttle performed a Rendezvous pitch maneuver prior to docking to allow the ISS crew to briefly inspect and photograph the Shuttle's heat shield. That maneuver began at 1402 GMT. An uneventful docking with the space station was performed, and upon hatch opening commander Steven W. Lindsey performed a gymnastic roll for the camera and gave a thumbs up. Thomas Reiter officially became a member of the International Space Station Expedition 13 crew shortly after docking, the transfer of his personalised Soyuz spacecraft seat liner, which cushions the landing indicated the official transfer point.

=== July 7 (flight day 4) ===
The Multi-Purpose Logistics Module Leonardo was mated to the space station's Unity module. There were concerns that some straps were in the way of the docking equipment, but following video inspections of the straps they were determined not to be a problem and docking continued as planned. The straps may be removed in the future.

A number of "focused inspections" of the Shuttle's heat shield has started. A second gap filler, described as being located near the arrowhead, is one of these points. This gap filler is thought to be protruding 1 cm - the location close to the nose making it of concern due to the potential for early disruption of the boundary layer over the base of the whole vehicle during reentry. There are six focused inspections being carried out, fewer than were required in STS-114. By the end of day four the gap filler observation was thought to be due to a fabric capping on a "tadpole" gap filler (a ceramic gap filler plate) wrapped with fabric along one edge to provide a tighter fit and a smoother surface.

The results of analysis of data collected by the wing leading edge sensors was discussed in the post mission management meeting briefing at the conclusion of day four. The sensors were revealed to have picked up six impacts. The maximum g observed was 1.6 g, compared to ground testing where of the order of 10 g were required to cause damage. Nevertheless, the inspection team on orbit will be taking a close look at the regions of interest, which are on both wings.

=== July 8 (flight day 5) ===
Michael Fossum and Piers Sellers performed a seven-and-a-half-hour space walk. They evaluated the use of the 50-foot (15 m) Orbital Boom Sensor System extension to the robotic arm as a work platform in case repairs are needed to the shuttle. The first step was to attach the foot restraints to the arm. First Piers Sellers worked alone; then Mike Fossum joined him - when both are on the arm they attempted increasingly vigorous operations that simulate various potential repair scenarios.

Initial reports from Michael Fossum and Piers Sellers suggested that the boom was damping out motion rapidly, making it a good work platform. Piers Sellers said at one point: "I felt almost no motions at all, just a few inches each way, very few motions". When standing on the boom while it was moving, they described it as very smooth.

Fossum had a problem with his 85-foot-long safety tether (26 m), which was damaged after he made a mistake; not realising he had left the tether in a locked position, he expected it to be automatically drawn tight. Upon realising the mistake Fossum said: "Oh no! ... That's embarrassing". The damaged tether had to be switched for a spare.

The other major task was to make safe a cable cutter on one site of the ISS's mobile transporter.

=== July 9 (flight day 6) ===
The morning's flight plan revision, emailed up to the crew contained the following request which many on Earth will be able to relate to:

If possible, please keep your Inbox, Sent Items, and Work Related folders as clean and empty as possible (either by deleting items or moving them to your personal folders). This is needed to reduce the time required to uplink new e-mail.

One of the day's highlights was a press conference from orbit, with questions from JSC, KSC, and the ESA.

Robotics operations continued, with the Canadarm2 releasing the mobile transporter from one end, while remaining attached with the other end to the Destiny module in preparation for the following day's work on the mobile transporter system. Other preparations for the second space walk continued, including the setting up of equipment, and cameras.

Additionally a new spacesuit being delivered to the ISS was transferred and underwent "checkout" procedures.

=== July 10 (flight day 7) ===
Sellers and Fossum performed a six-hour-forty-seven-minute space walk. They deployed a spare pump module and replaced a reel of umbilical cable carrying power, data and video for operating the station's Mobile Transporter rail car.

=== July 11 (flight day 8) ===
The crews prepared for the third and final spacewalk to be conducted during STS-121's visit to the station, expected to begin at 7:13 a.m. July 12.

The astronauts also continued cargo transfers between the shuttle, the International Space Station and the Leonardo multi-purpose logistics module. Leonardo arrived with more than 7,400 pounds of equipment and supplies for the station. Leonardo will be returned Friday to the payload bay packed with more than 4,300 pounds of science experiment results, unneeded items and trash.

At 10:35 a.m. EDT, President George W. Bush had a private telephone conversation with the crew, during which he told the astronauts that they represent the best of service and exploration, and thanked them for the job they are doing.

Pilot Mark E. Kelly suggested during an on-orbit press conference that the wake-up songs should be made known to the crew before they are woken up by them when he said:

Sometimes we know ahead of time what the music is going to be and who it's for, other times it's a complete surprise and you just get woken up by it and have to scrabble around thinking of something profound to say about it.

=== July 12 (flight day 9) ===
A spacewalk to demonstrate shuttle repair techniques was carried out by Sellers and Fossum. Repairs were done on pre-damaged samples of heat shield materials brought into space on a special pallet in the payload bay of the shuttle. The repairs under test are expected to perform best when the material has been warm and is cooling, so the actions were carefully coordinated by mission control with regard to exposure of the samples to sunlight. While the procedures, and NOAX (Non-Oxide Adhesive Experimental) material has been tested in a vacuum on Earth, the zero G tests are required because of off gases generated by the material and the potential for bubbles to form that could weaken the structure of the repair.

Following a problem on the previous EVA where latches on a SAFER became detached, Kapton tape was used to ensure the latches remained closed on this EVA. Kapton tape was used rather than the duct tape (which the shuttle program calls "grey tape") as it is smoother.

Piers lost one of the spatulas he was using to put the NOAX onto the samples of heat shield material. As he lost it he said, "Guys I've got to tell you my spatula's escaped." He tried to locate it himself with the assistance of Fossum, who said "Don't worry it happens." Mission controllers saw the spatula float away over the port side of the shuttle payload bay. The tool is not expected to cause any problems. Calculations were conducted and mission control reported to the EVA crew that "We have no FOD (Foreign Object Debris) hazard in the payload bay." Piers apologised for letting go of the tool and causing the extra work on the ground associated with calculating whether the loose tool posed a hazard.

=== July 13 (flight day 10) ===
The Space Shuttle Discovery (STS-121) crew enjoyed a well-deserved day off after having completed three successful space walks and transferring thousands of pounds of supplies and equipment earlier in the flight.

Events taking place on this day were interviews for both the International Space Station (ISS) and Shuttle crews.

Mission Specialist Mike Fossum received a call from Texas Governor Rick Perry, who like Fossum, is a graduate of the Texas A&M University. He mentioned to Fossum how proud he was to have the first Aggie in space. "Aggies are all up in great arms to have the first Aggie in space," said Perry. "You are making some history, Michael."

Later in the afternoon, Fossum and Nowak participated in live interviews with MSNBC and Fox News Live.

Expedition 13 crewmember Jeffrey Williams confirmed steps and final procedures for closeout of the MPLM which will be relocated from the International Space Station to Discovery's payload bay.

=== July 14 (flight day 11) ===
Transfer of Leonardo to the shuttle payload bay was completed in preparation for Discovery's departure from the International Space Station. Wilson and Nowak used the ISS robotic arm to complete the transfer of the module packed with over 4000 pounds of material to return to Earth.

Wilson and Nowak also used the shuttle's arm and extension boom to inspect the shuttle's port wing for any signs of micro-meteoroid damage while on-orbit. The other wing and the nose cap will be inspected on flight day twelve following undocking.

The major discussion on the ground was around a small leak, a "APU 1 fuel tank pressure decay", in either a nitrogen or hydrazine tank, in one of the three redundant auxiliary power units which generate hydraulic power for use controlling the flight control surfaces during landing. The chances are that it is a nitrogen leak; however it is being treated as a hydrazine leak as that is a worst-case scenario – hydrazine being flammable and corrosive.

It is possible, depending on the way the system behaves during the checkout planned for flight day 12, that the shuttle team will burn off the hydrazine in orbit. This would leave hydraulic system one non-operational during landing, forcing the shuttle to use pyrotechnics for the deployment of landing gear, and disabling powered steering of the nose wheel - though the vehicle would be controllable on landing through directional braking.

=== July 15 (flight day 12) ===
Space Shuttle Discovery's STS 121 crew undocked from International Space Station after a 9-day stay. Undocking occurred over the Pacific Ocean just north of New Zealand.

Mark Kelly flew Discovery to a point above the station before performing the final separation burn.

Crew members also used the robotic arm and the orbital boom sensor system to perform final inspections of the starboard wing and shuttle nosecap for any damage that may have been caused by orbital debris while docked with the International Space Station.

=== July 16 (flight day 13) ===
Troubleshooting of one of the Flash Evaporator Subsystem (FES) (FES PRI B) was carried out, 'A' would be used during reentry but it is desirable to have both functional. This was in addition to the usual extensive "checkout" of all those systems required for reentry ensuring they were functional. The main area of concern was APU-1, tests on APU-1 also increased confidence in its integrity to the point where mission controllers decided to use the unit as normal for the re-entry.

Other activities included a long series of live press conferences from orbit, and preparations for landing which include stowing items on the middeck, fitting the seats in place, and for the CDR and Pilot - practising a simulated landing.

Discovery received a clean bill of health on the recent heat shield inspections and was given a "Go for landing", this was relayed to the crew while they were on their midday meal break. There were only two very minor deviations from a nominal landing procedure planned, APU one may be started early, and due to the problems with the heater thermostat on APU 3 the heater would have to be turned off manually by one of the crew. This switch will have to be thrown while the crew are suited up in their seats ready for landing. The crew said they would mark the switch with grey tape. The crew were told that only KSC was to be "called up" for a landing on the 17 July, meaning that in the case of unsuitable weather at KSC on the 17th the landing would have been delayed until the 18th. On the 18th Edwards Air Force Base was the prime alternative to KSC. Showers were forecast in the area of KSC on the morning of the 17th, the crew were assured that the weather at Edwards looked good on both days.

=== July 17 (flight day 14 and landing) ===
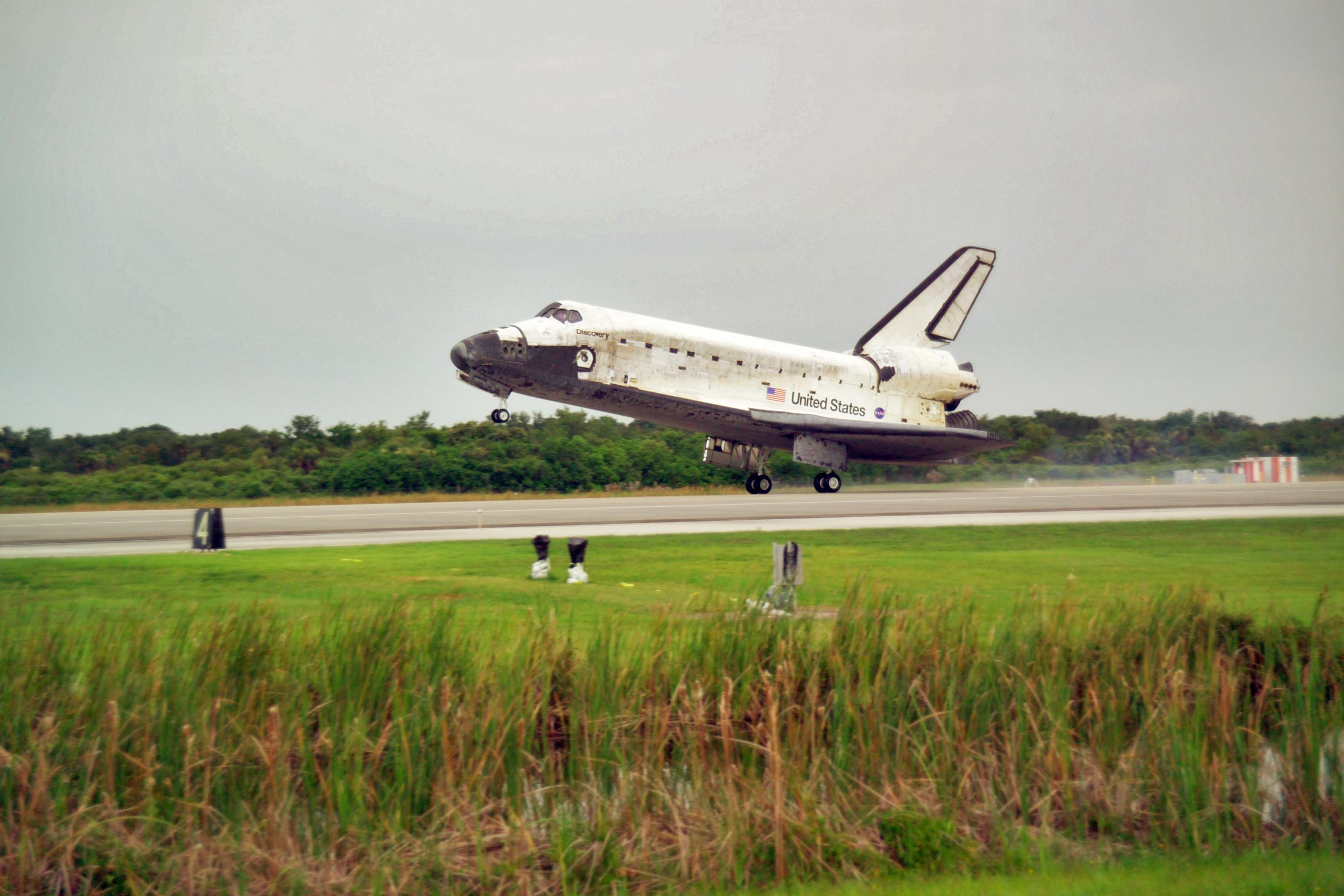
The landing of STS-121.

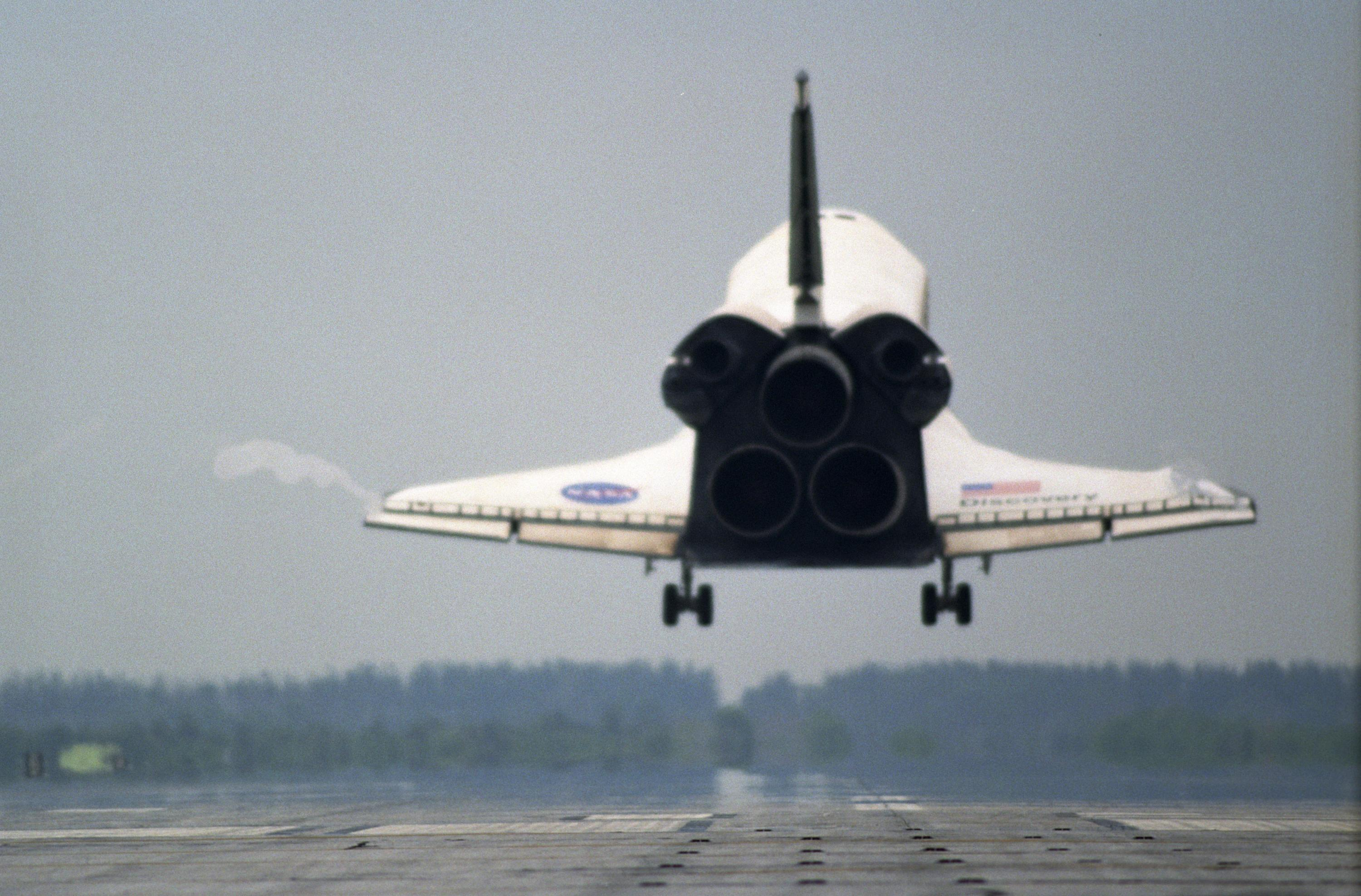
Landing from end of runway 15.

Atmospheric reentry and landing at Kennedy Space Center's Shuttle Landing Facility.

Detailed timeline for first landing opportunity:

- 3:13 am CDT Deorbit Prep begins
- 4:24 am CDT Payload Bay Doors Closing
- 4:36 am CDT MCC "Go" for Ops 3 Transition
- 5:40 am CDT Clothing Configuration
- 6:04 am CDT Seat Ingress
- 6:16 am CDT OMS Gimbal Check
- 6:30 am CDT APU Prestart
- 6:45 am CDT MCC "Go-No Go" Decision for the Deorbit Burn
- 6:52 am CDT Maneuver to the Deorbit Burn Attitude
- 7:07 am CDT Deorbit Burn
- 8:14 am CDT Landing at Kennedy Space Center
- 8:15 am CDT Wheels stop

The deorbit burn phase began successfully at 7:07 am CDT, committing Discovery to land on the 17th. At 8:08 am CDT, Discovery was safely out of reentry and headed toward a landing at KSC runway 15. The original landing target (Runway 33) was ruled out at the last minute due to showers south of KSC where the orbiter would have circled before landing. Shortly before landing the right air data probe initially failed to deploy. It began functioning of its own accord a few minutes later.

Discovery landed successfully on schedule at 8:14:43am CDT with three good APUs throughout the landing procedure. During the post landing inspection tour, Lindsey remarked that this was one of the cleanest inspections he had ever done.

During post landing press briefings it was revealed that:

- Discovery's windows were to be replaced before the next mission, STS-116, so that the old ones could be studied by engineers at Corning to find out the cause of small imperfections which appeared during the mission.
- The mission's demonstration that the shuttle's arm could be used as a work platform was a good sign for a potential future Hubble Space Telescope mission.

== Additional personnel ==
As well as the shuttle crew, the ISS crew was key to this mission. The ISS crew included: Commander Pavel Vinogradov and Flight Engineer Jeffrey Williams.

CAPCOM – those responsible for speaking on the radio to the Shuttle from mission control were:

Steve Frick / Rick Sturckow During Ascent/Descent; Rick Mastracchio / Lee Archambault while in Orbit; Julie Payette for ISS Operations

The launch director was Michael D. Leinbach; the flight director's position in mission control was held by Steve Stich during launch and re-entry and by Tony Ceccacci / Norm Knight during orbital operations.

== Wake-up calls ==
A tradition for NASA spaceflights since the days of Gemini, mission crews are played a special musical track at the start of each day in space. Each track is specially chosen, often by their family, and usually has special meaning to an individual member of the crew, or is applicable to their daily activities.

| Flight day | Song | Artist | Played for | Note | Links |
|---|---|---|---|---|---|
| Day 2 | "Lift Every Voice and Sing" | New Galveston Chorale | Stephanie Wilson | The group is local to Wilson's hometown. Wilson explained in her response to the wake up that it was chosen as a reminder that everyone, whoever they are and whatever they do, can participate in the space program. | MP3 WAV |
| Day 3 | "Daniel" | Elton John | Thomas Reiter | From Reiter's son Daniel, and his wife. Thomas responded that it served as: "A reminder that there are people on Earth thinking and waiting for us who give us the strength to do what we're doing". | MP3 WAV |
| Day 4 | "Good Day Sunshine" | The Beatles | Lisa Nowak | Nowak responded that they have a sun-rise every 90 minutes and have plenty to laugh about. | MP3 WAV |
| Day 5 | "God of Wonders" | Marc Byrd and Steve Hindalong | Mike Fossum | From his family on the day of his first EVA. | MP3 WAV |
| Day 6 | "I Have a Dream" | ABBA | Mark Kelly | From his family. | MP3 WAV |
| Day 7 | "Clocks" | Coldplay | Piers Sellers | The CAPCOM explained: "That song was from Mandy and the kids and they hope you enjoy your EVA today." | MP3 WAV |
| Day 8 | "All Star" | Smash Mouth | Lisa Nowak | From her family | MP3 WAV |
| Day 9 | "I Believe I Can Fly" | (local students in her area) | Stephanie Wilson | Original performed by R. Kelly | MP3 WAV |
| Day 10 | "Theme from Charlie's Angels" | | Entire crew | On behalf of their flight training team on Earth | MP3 WAV |
| Day 11 | "The Texas Aggie War Hymn" | The Fightin' Texas Aggie Band | Mike Fossum | From his wife Melanie, Fossum is an A&M graduate | MP3 WAV |
| Day 12 | "Beautiful Day" | U2 | Mark Kelly | From his girlfriend Gabby Giffords | MP3 WAV |
| Day 13 | "Just Like Heaven" | The Cure | Piers Sellers | From his family | MP3 WAV |
| Day 14 | "The Astronaut" | Something Corporate | Steven Lindsey | From his family in honor of landing day | MP3 WAV |

== Contingency planning ==
There are various contingency plans for failures occurring during and immediately after launch, known as abort modes. If the comprehensive inspections of the shuttle's heat shield which was conducted once the vehicle was in orbit had suggested that it would not be able to survive a re-entry, or another problem occurred, then Atlantis, commanded by Brent Jett, would have been used to mount the STS-301 rescue mission which involves the shuttle crew transferring to the ISS then awaiting rescue. STS-121 was the first shuttle mission to carry an 8.5-meter cable designed to connect the flight deck manual controls used during landing to an avionics bay in the middeck allowing mission controllers to land the shuttle uncrewed if required. However the Rescue Flight Resource Book released following STS-121 states that a controlled break-up rather than a landing was planned for a disabled shuttle.

One of the contingency plans most likely to be put into action was a landing at alternate site (primarily Dryden Flight Research Center and Edwards Air Force Base) in the event of bad weather at KSC. In addition to the specific plans, NASA had a generic "mishap response plan", and the shuttle software was pre-loaded with information on a large number of airfields that were potential landing sites. In many cases, the airfields were unaware of their presence in the shuttle software.

=== STS-300 ===
STS-300 was the designation given to the Contingency Shuttle Crew Support mission which would have launched in the event Space Shuttle Discovery became disabled during STS-114 or STS-121. The rescue mission for STS-114 was a modified version of the STS-121 mission, which would have involved the launch date being brought forward. If needed, it would have launched no earlier than August 11, 2005. The crew for this mission was a 4-person subset of the full STS-121 crew:

- Steven Lindsey, Commander and backup Remote Manipulator System (RMS) operator
- Mark Kelly, Pilot and prime RMS operator
- Michael E. Fossum, Mission Specialist 1 and Extravehicular 2
- Piers Sellers, Mission Specialist 2 and Extravehicular 1

== Pre-launch concerns ==
Following the flight readiness review meeting which concluded on June 17, 2006, NASA's Chief Engineer Christopher Scolese and Chief Safety and Mission Assurance Officer Bryan O'Connor, who served as pilot on STS-61-B and commanded STS-40, decided that from their point of view they were going to recommend that the shuttle not be flown. O'Connor later expanded this to explain that this is due to the potential for the loss of the vehicle; he supported the collective decision to fly, however, especially given the option for the crew to stay on the ISS and await rescue if the shuttle is unable to return to earth. Both Scolese and O'Connor included notes explaining their position in their entries in the official plans.

Statement by Scolese and O'Connor as released by NASA:

Crew safety is our first and most important concern. We believe that our crew can safely return from this mission. We both feel that there remain issues with the orbiter – there is the potential that foam may come off at time of launch. That's why we feel we should redesign the ice/frost ramp before we fly this mission. We do not feel, however, that these issues are a threat to safe return of the crew. We have openly discussed our position in the Flight Readiness Review – open communication is how we work at NASA. The Flight Readiness Review board and the administrator have heard all the different engineering positions, including ours, and have made an informed decision and the agency is accepting this risk with its eyes wide open.

NASA's public affairs office had said following the flight readiness review that O'Connor and Scolese would not talk to the media about their objections. On June 20 it was reported that O'Connor was readily agreeing to interviews and also said the statement was actually written by the public affairs office and agreed by the two officials.

On the morning of the first launch attempt, on July 1, concerns included weather, external fuel tank foam, and a thruster failure. The thruster failure was detected via abnormally low thermostat readings in one of the left Orbital Maneuvering System (OMS) pods. The thruster in question – L5L, one of 38 – was considered inoperable. The plan was not to fix the problem, but to ensure that any reduction in maneuverability resulting from the failure is within the limits that the crew can cope with on orbit. Thruster L5L became operational again after mission managers decided to use sunlight to warm up the thruster to normal operational levels and it was able to be used during the docking procedures with the ISS.

== Mission coverage ==
NASA's simulation website was regularly updated as the launch approached. Shortly after launch NASA TV online and via cable was seriously disrupted by a thunderstorm over Goddard Space Flight Center from where NASA TV is uplinked to satellites for distribution.

The entire mission was covered on NASA TV and was available online worldwide, on cable, and on satellite in the USA. In the United States, CNN, C-SPAN, FOX News, HDNet, and MSNBC had live coverage of the launch and landing.

== Media ==
Space Shuttle Discovery launches from launch pad 39B at Kennedy Space Center as part of the STS-121 mission

== See also ==
- 2006 in spaceflight
- List of human spaceflights
- List of Space Shuttle missions
- Outline of space science
- Space Shuttle program
