= NASA Causeway =

Bridge in Florida, United States of America

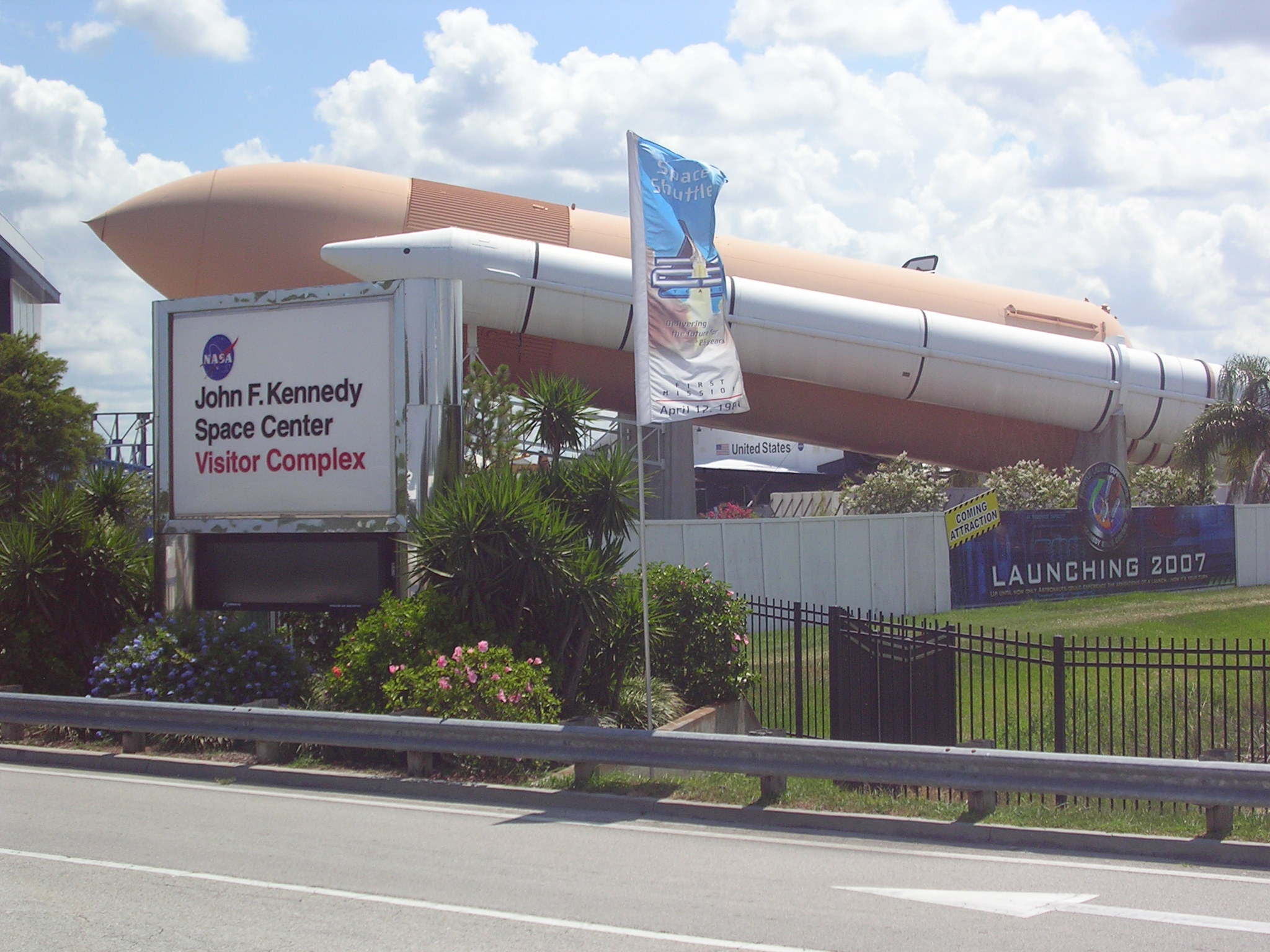
- Visitors Complex from NASA Causeway
- Coordinates: 28°31′39″N 80°46′15″W
- Carries: CR 405
- Locale: Brevard County, Florida

Location
- Interactive map of NASA Causeway

The NASA Causeway, is an east–west expressway in Brevard County, Florida, containing two causeways. The first causeway connects the Florida mainland to Merritt Island and later, over the private second causeway, connects Merritt Island to Cape Canaveral. As such, the NASA Causeway is the main route connecting points of interest in Titusville, Florida to the Kennedy Space Center on Merritt Island.

== Route description ==
=== First causeway ===
The first causeway begins on the mainland when Columbia Boulevard crosses U.S. Route 1 in Titusville and experiences a name change. This is also the terminus of State Road 405. Continuing eastward, NASA Causeway crosses the Indian River Lagoon. A bascule bridge permitted boats on the Intracoastal Waterway to pass through the causeway, previous to construction of the new high rise span.

==== Bridge replacement ====
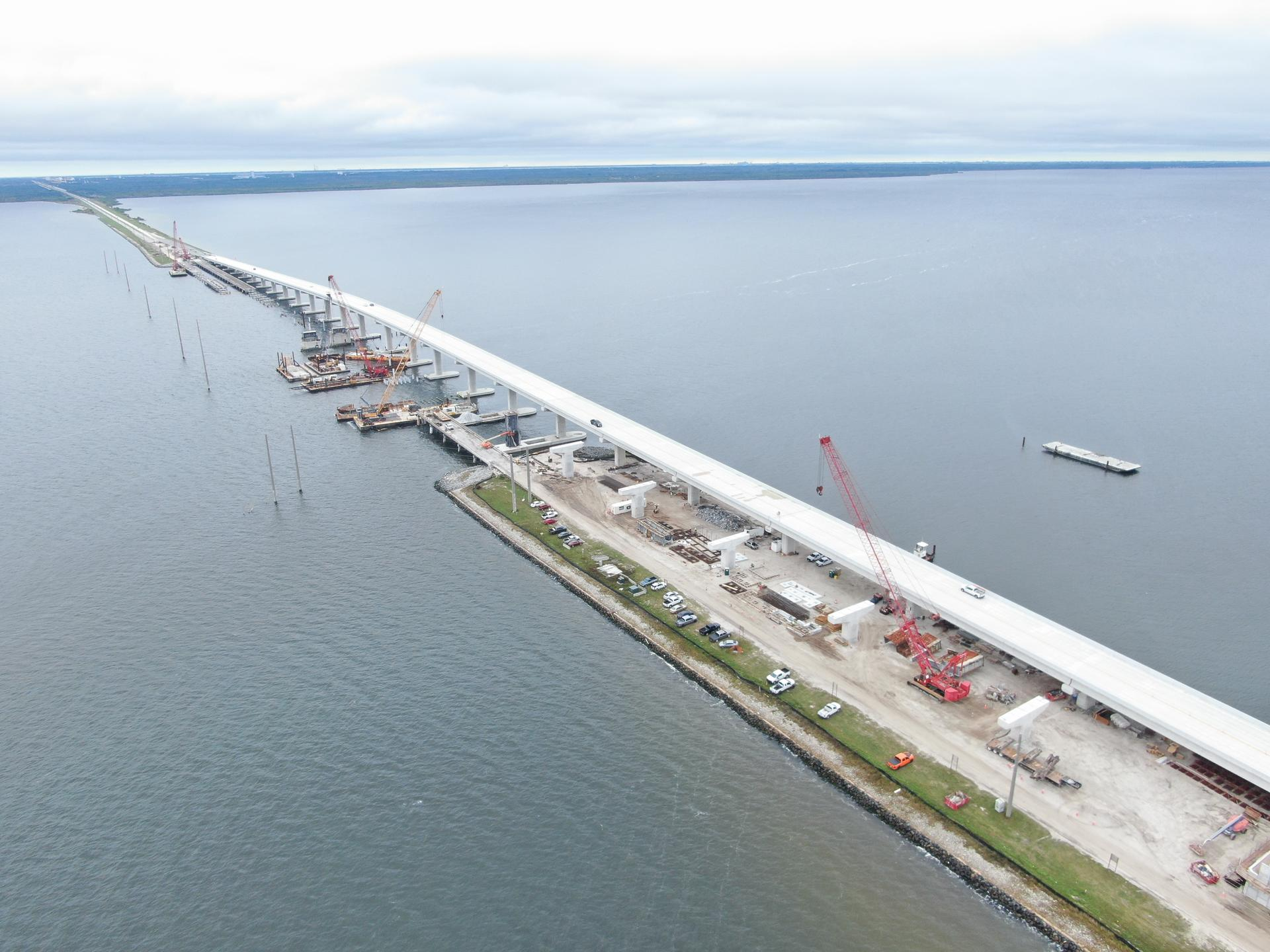
NASA Causeway bridge construction as it appeared on November 27, 2023.

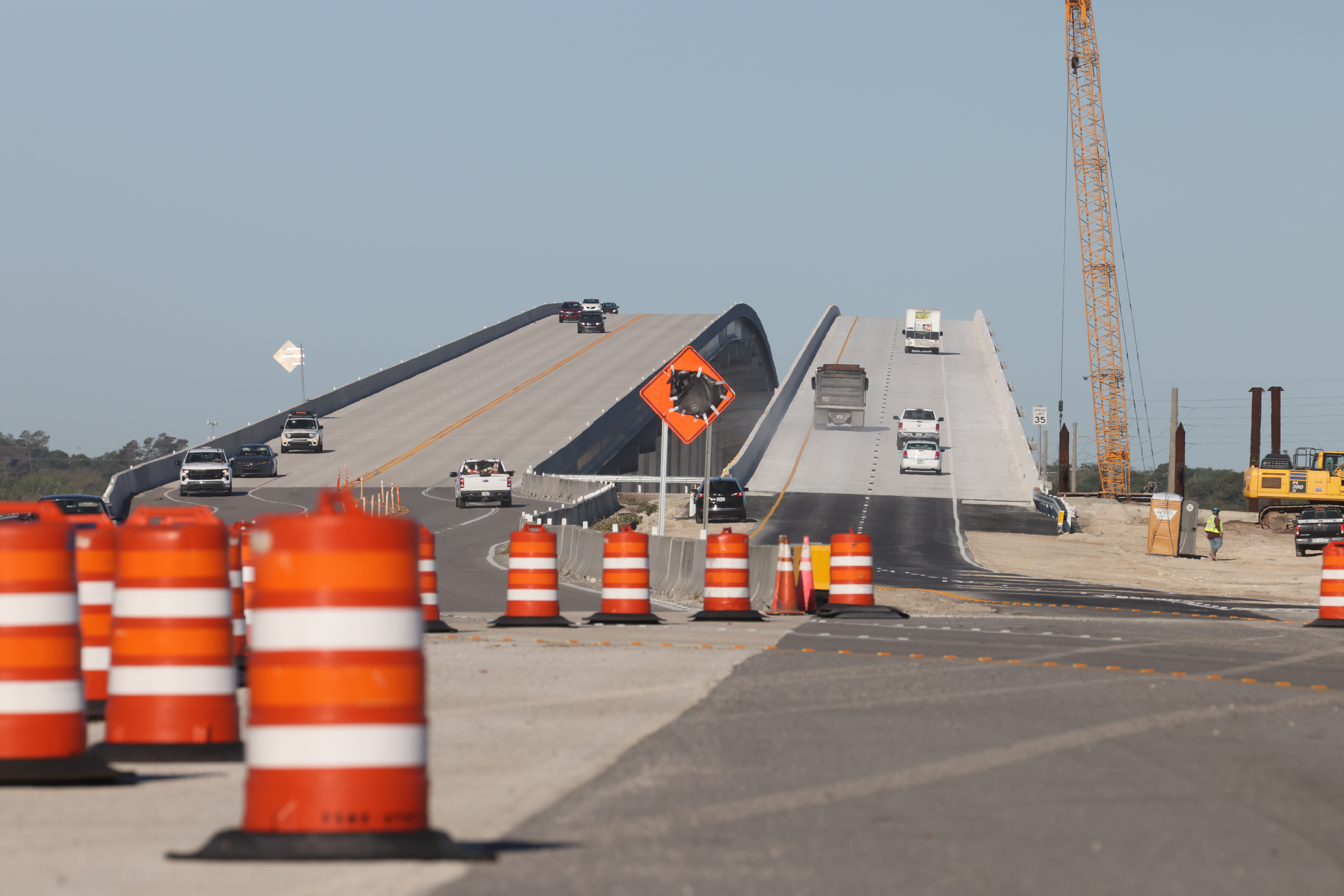
Looking west at the newly completed westbound span on March 19, 2025.

On June 9, 2023, a new eastbound high rise span opened, 125 days ahead of schedule. This span served four lane two way traffic until completion of the westbound high rise span. Prior to commencement of construction of the westbound span, both existing bascule bridge spans were torn down. On March 19, 2025, the new westbound high rise span opened, 6 months ahead of schedule.

=== NASA Parkway West ===
Continuing eastward, approximately 2 miles (3.2 km), it enters the Merritt Island National Wildlife Refuge and the John F. Kennedy Space Center. About 2 miles (3.2 km) in, the road reaches an intersection with Florida State Road 321 (Space Commerce Way). The majority of traffic on NASA Parkway turns here, as the main entrance to the Kennedy Space Center is located down this road. At this point, the Merritt Island peninsula is at its widest and about 7 miles (11 km) wide.

East of Space Commerce Way, the Parkway passes the former main gate of the Kennedy Space Center Visitor Complex. The general public is not permitted beyond this point. Approximately 0.6 miles (0.97 km) east of the Visitor Complex, a NASA security gate permits access to authorized tour buses and Kennedy Space Center staff and supply vehicles only. Immediately east of the gate, the Parkway contains a diamond interchange with Courtenay Parkway, the division line between the western and eastern portions of the Parkway.

Tour buses reach the Vehicle Assembly Building, the Apollo/Saturn V Center and the Space Shuttle landing strip by journeying north from this point on Kennedy Parkway.

=== NASA Parkway East ===
The eastern section of the NASA Parkway begins at its intersection with Courtenay Parkway (Note: sometimes erroneously known as State Road or County Road 3 when in fact those routes terminate much farther south than this intersection) in the former town of Orsino, Florida. Traveling east, it passes an area of support buildings and offices. At the end of this area, it reduces from four lanes to two and crosses the Banana River as a two-lane causeway with a bascule bridge.

=== Second causeway ===
The causeway over the Banana River is less known than the first causeway, as it is not accessible to the general public. The main use of the causeway is for military personnel to reach the mainland, as the route leads from Merritt Island to Cape Canaveral Space Force Station.

The NASA Parkway designation ends shortly after the NASA Causeway's eastern end, where the parkway terminates at the Samuel C Philips Parkway. From this point, authorized users can reach the point of Cape Canaveral via Central Control Road. The Cape Canaveral Light is visible, and, via Lighthouse Road, authorized users can reach Launch Complex 46.

== Alternatives ==
While the NASA Parkway is the principal access route for tourists from Titusville and points west (such as Orlando, Florida), visitors from points to the south, such as Cocoa Beach, Florida need not use NASA Parkway West to cross the Indian River. Instead, they may approach the Kennedy Space Center from the south on Florida State Route 3, which terminates at the Kennedy Space Center property line. Diverted by a security gate, the general public must turn left on Space Commerce Way and reach the Visitor Complex directly from the main gate.
