= Florida State Road 321 =

State highway in Brevard County, Florida, United States

State Road 321

Route information
- Maintained by FDOT
- Length: 2.672 mi (4.300 km)
- Existed: 2026–present

Major junctions
- South end: SR 3 at Kennedy Space Center
- North end: SR 405 at Kennedy Space Center

Location
- Country: United States
- State: Florida
- Counties: Brevard

Highway system
- Florida State Highway System; Interstate; US; State; Former; Pre‑1945; Toll; Scenic
← SR 320	→ SR 326

State Road 321 (SR 321), known locally as Space Commerce Way is a 2.7-mile (4.3 km) north–south road located entirely on Merritt Island Florida, providing access to the Exploration Park portion of Kennedy Space Center. Built in 2001 by NASA and the Florida Space Research Institute, the road was originally constructed with two lanes; it was widened to a four-lane divided highway in 2025, and received a designation as a state highway in January 2026. The route number 321 was chosen as a nod to the launch countdowns at KSC.

The road runs from SR 405 (NASA Causeway) at its north end to SR 3 (Kennedy Parkway) at its southern terminus. The road provides access to several space-oriented companies based in the Exploration Park facility, including Redwire, Blue Origin, and Airbus US Space & Defense. The main entrance to the Kennedy Space Center Visitor Complex is also located on Space Commerce Way.

== Major intersections ==
The entire route is in Merritt Island, Brevard County.

mi	km	Destinations	Notes
0.000	0.000	SR 3 – Merritt Island, Cape Canaveral, Cocoa Beach	Southern terminus
2.672	4.300	SR 405 – Titusville, Orlando	Northern terminus
1.000 mi = 1.609 km; 1.000 km = 0.621 mi
