= Florida Distance Learning Consortium =

Florida Distance Learning Consortium

The Florida Distance Learning Consortium is a network of all public (39) and private (27) post secondary institutions in Florida serving a total of 1.3 million students annually. These institutions range in size from fewer than 2000 to over 100,000 students. The FDLC is funded by the Florida legislature and supports its member institutions in their delivery of e-Learning through support for student and web services, faculty development, statewide licensing, and sharing resources, including a learning object repository and an of over 10,000 distance learning courses offered by membership institutions throughout Florida.

The FDLC facilitates cross-institutional communication and spearheads statewide initiatives in Distance Learning. Recognizing the autonomy of Florida’s educational institutions, the Consortium relies on the voluntary participation of its members to coordinate its activities.. There is no charge for membership.

== Member Institutions ==
=== Community Colleges ===
- Brevard Community College
- Broward Community College
- Central Florida Community College
- Chipola College
- Daytona Beach Community College
- Edison Community College
- Florida Community College at Jacksonville
- Florida Keys Community College
- Gulf Coast Community College
- Hillsborough Community College
- Indian River Community College
- Lake City Community College
- Lake-Sumter State College
- Manatee Community College
- Miami-Dade College
- North Florida Community College
- Okaloosa-Walton College
- Palm Beach Community College
- Pasco–Hernando State College
- Pensacola Junior College
- Polk Community College
- St. Johns River Community College
- St. Petersburg College
- Santa Fe Community College
- Seminole Community College
- South Florida Community College
- Tallahassee Community College
- Valencia Community College

=== Independent Colleges and Universities of Florida (ICUF) ===
- Barry University
- Bethune-Cookman College
- Clearwater Christian College
- Eckerd College
- Edward Waters College
- Embry-Riddle Aeronautical University
- Flagler College
- Florida College
- Florida Hospital College of Health Sciences
- Florida Institute of Technology
- Florida Memorial College
- Florida Southern College
- Florida Space Research Institute
- Hodges University
- Jacksonville University
- Lynn University
- Nova Southeastern University
- Palm Beach Atlantic University
- Rollins College
- Saint Leo University
- Southeastern University
- St. Thomas University
- Stetson University
- University of Miami
- University of Tampa
- Warner Southern College
- Webber International University

=== State Universities ===
- Florida Agricultural & Mechanical University
- Florida Atlantic University
- Florida Gulf Coast University
- Florida International University
- Florida State University
- New College of Florida
- University of Central Florida
- University of Florida
- University of North Florida
- University of South Florida
- University of West Florida
