= Cape Canaveral (disambiguation) =

Cape Canaveral may refer to:

- Cape Canaveral, a headland in Florida
- Cape Canaveral Space Force Station, a U.S. Space Force spaceport on the cape.
- Cape Canaveral, Florida, USA; a city on the cape.
- John F. Kennedy Space Center (KSC), Merritt Island, Florida, USA; a spaceport neighboring Cape Canaveral Space Force Station, sometimes referred to as 'Cape Canaveral'
- Spaceport Florida, the commercial spaceport operated by Florida through Space Florida on the Space Coast
- Space Coast, Florida, USA; the general region containing the cape
- Shuttle Landing Facility (airport) KSC, Florida; sometimes referred to as 'Cape Canaveral'
