= Florida State Road 405 =

State highway in Florida, United States

State Road 405
- SR 405 in red, CR 405 in blue

Route information
- Maintained by FDOT
- Length: 10.108 mi (16.267 km)

Major junctions
- East end: SR 321 in Kennedy Space Center
- SR 50 in Titusville
- North end: US 1 in Titusville

Location
- Country: United States
- State: Florida
- Counties: Brevard

Highway system
- Florida State Highway System; Interstate; US; State; Former; Pre‑1945; Toll; Scenic
← SR 404	→ SR 406

State Road 405 (SR 405) is a state highway making a sweeping arc in Titusville, Florida, and, via the nearby NASA Parkway, providing a major access route for the Kennedy Space Center on nearby Merritt Island. The northern terminus of SR 405 is an intersection with North Washington Avenue (U.S. 1) in downtown Titusville; the eastern terminus is at Florida State Road 321 in the Kennedy Space Center. It is locally known as South Street and Columbia Boulevard.

== Route description ==
South of Cheney Highway (SR 50), SR 405 is signed east–west and is named Columbia Boulevard. North of SR 50, SR 405 is signed north–south and is named South Street. It parallels Interstate 95 for 2.2 miles (3.5 km) - from Cheney Highway to Willis Drive - before veering off to the northeast towards downtown Titusville.

In addition, SR 405 passes by Space Coast Regional Airport (formerly Ti-Co (Titusville-Cocoa) Airport) and Enchanted Forest Park.

== Major intersections ==
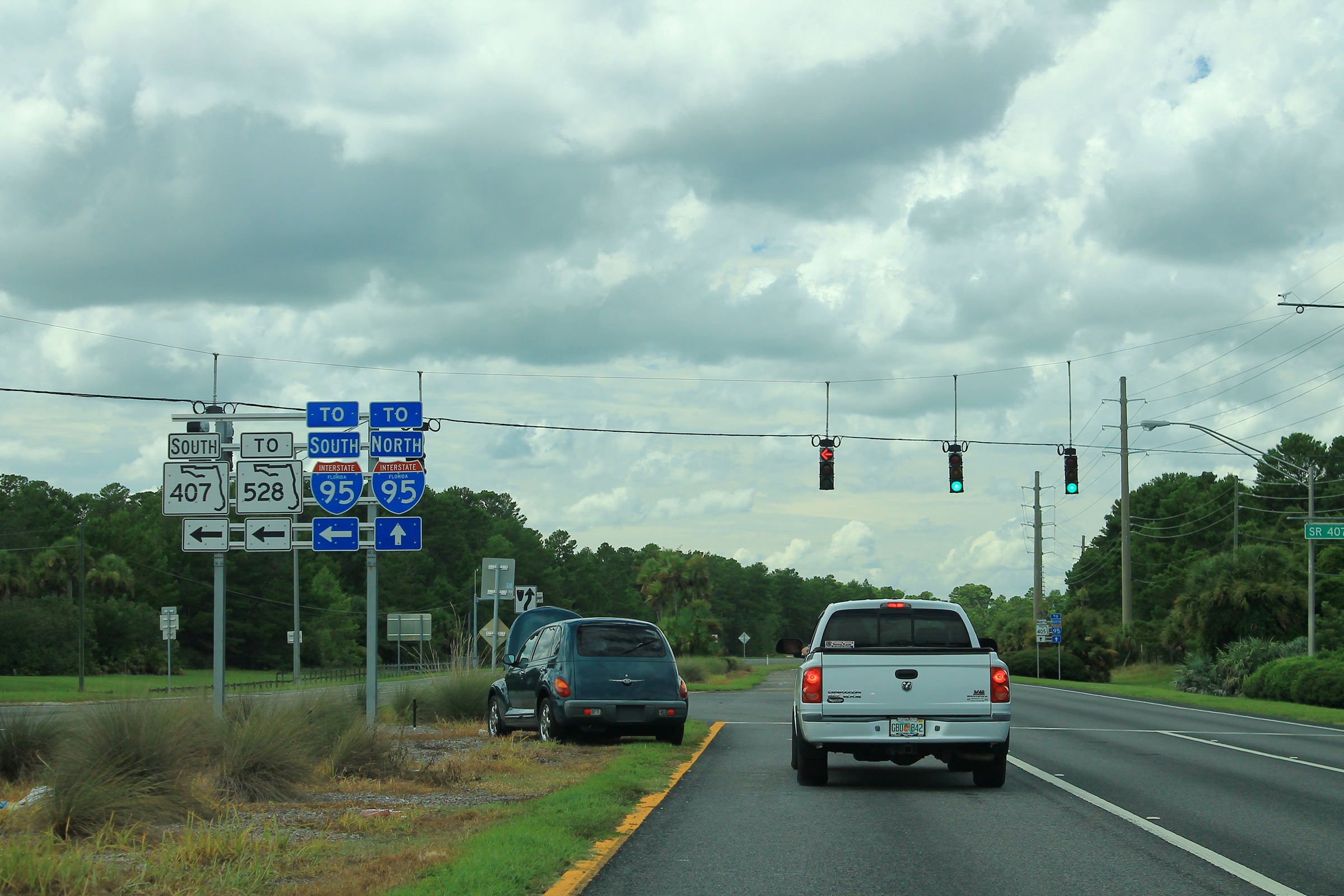
SR 405 at the northeastern terminus of SR 407 in Titusville.

The entire route is in Titusville, Brevard County.

mi	km	Destinations	Notes
		SR 321 south to SR 3 – KSC Visitor Complex, Merritt Island, Cape Canaveral, Cocoa Beach	South end of state maintenance
0.000	0.000	Indian River	
0.12	0.19	Vectorspace Boulevard - Astronaut Hall of Fame	
0.50	0.80	US 1 (SR 5) – Cocoa, Titusville, Beach Wildlife Refuge	
2.292	3.689	SR 407 south to SR 528 / I-95 south – Airport	
4.686	7.541	SR 50 (Cheney Highway) to I-95 – Orlando, Titusville	
10.062	16.193	US 1 south (Hopkins Avenue / SR 5) – Cocoa	
10.108	16.267	US 1 north (Washington Avenue / SR 5)	
1.000 mi = 1.609 km; 1.000 km = 0.621 mi
