= Kennedy Space Center Visitor Complex =

Museum in Florida about the US space program

- Previously known as Spaceport USA, Visitor Information Complex
- Interactive map of Kennedy Space Center Visitor Complex
- Location: Merritt Island, Florida, United States
- Coordinates: 28.5233°N 80.6819°W
- Opened: August 1, 1967
- Owner: NASA
- Operated by: Delaware North Companies
- Theme: NASA and space exploration
- Operating season: Open Year-round
- Attendance: 1.7 million
- Area: 42 acres (17 ha)
- Website: http://www.kennedyspacecenter.com

The Kennedy Space Center Visitor Complex is the visitor center at NASA's Kennedy Space Center on Merritt Island, Florida. It features exhibits and displays, historic spacecraft and memorabilia, shows, two IMAX theaters, and a range of bus tours of the spaceport. The "Space Shuttle Atlantis" exhibit contains the Atlantis orbiter and the Shuttle Launch Experience, a simulated ride into space. The center also provides astronaut training experiences, including a multi-axial chair and Mars Base simulator. The visitor complex also has daily presentations from a veteran NASA astronaut. A bus tour, included with admission, encompasses the separate Apollo/Saturn V Center. There were 1.7 million visitors to the visitor complex in 2016.

== History ==
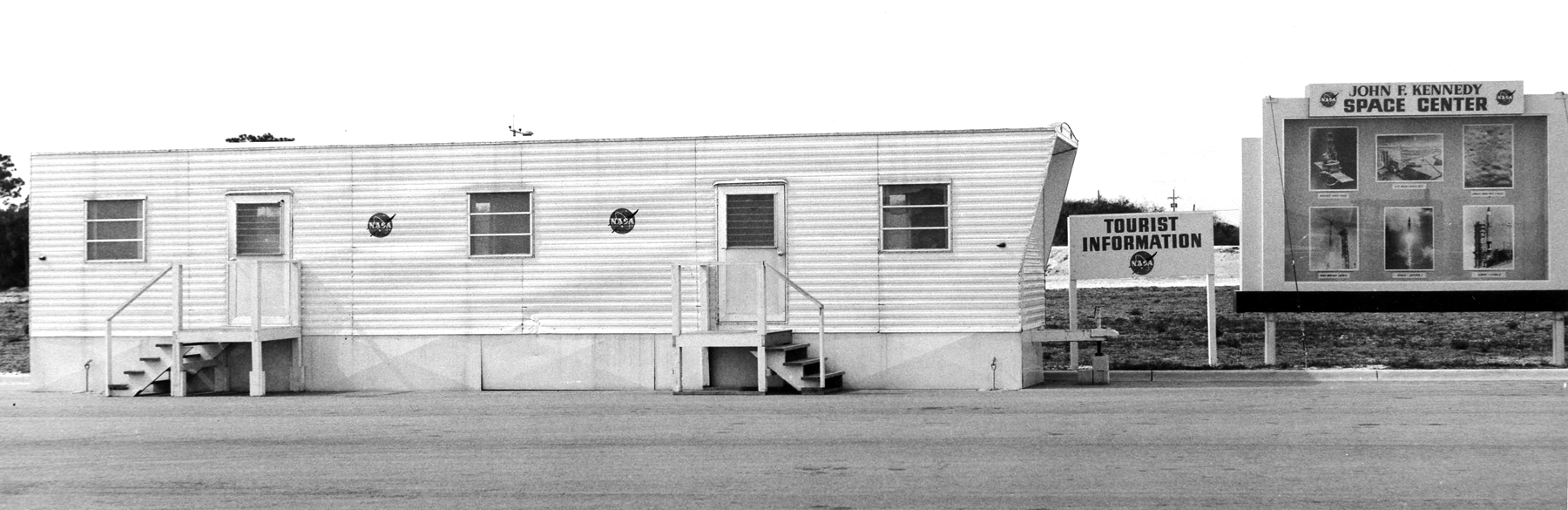
A small trailer served as the Visitors Information Center in the early 1960s

The complex had its beginning in 1963 when NASA Administrator James Webb established self-guided tours where the public could drive along a predetermined route through the Cape Canaveral Air Force Station and a small trailer containing simple displays on card tables. An estimated 100,000 visitors went through that first year.

As the American space program's popularity grew with the Mercury Program and Alan Shepard's historic launch, large numbers of press and public flocked to the Cape Canaveral area to get a close up view. Webb was urged by U.S. Rep. Olin Teague of Texas to create a visitors' program. By 1964, more than 250,000 self-guided car tours, permitted between 1 and 4 pm. ET on Sundays, were seen at Kennedy Space Center (KSC).

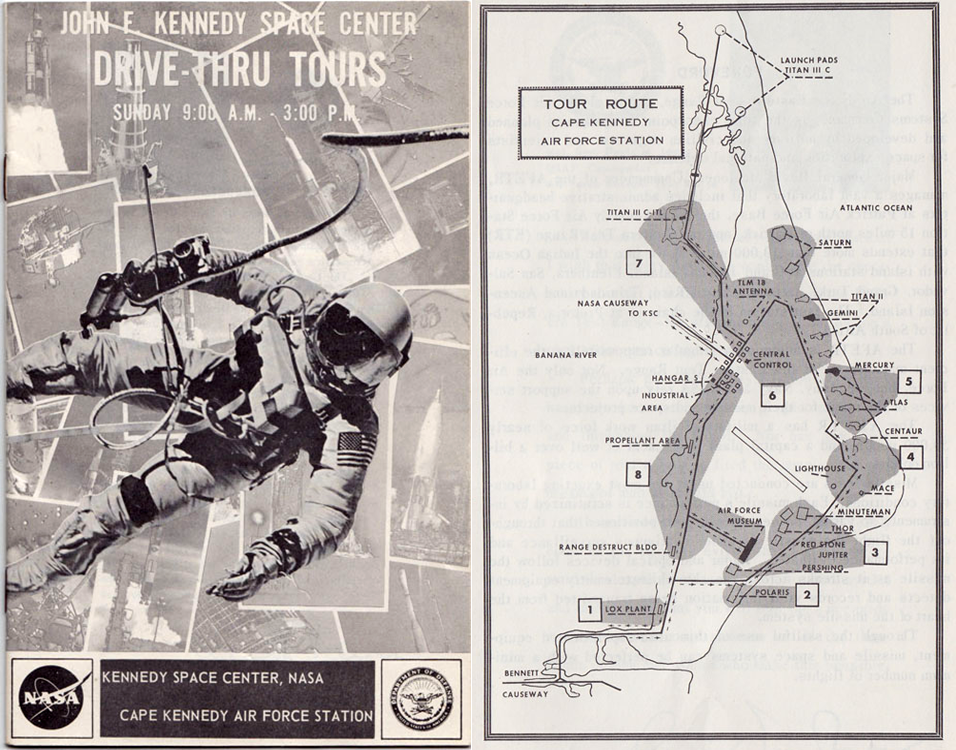
self-guided tour from the 1960s

In 1965, KSC Director Kurt H. Debus was authorized to spend $2 million on a full-scale visitor center, covering 42 acres. Spaceport USA, as it was soon titled, hosted 500,000 visitors in 1967, its first year, and one million by 1969. Ten-thousand visitors toured the center on December 24, 1968, following the Apollo 8 orbit of the Moon.

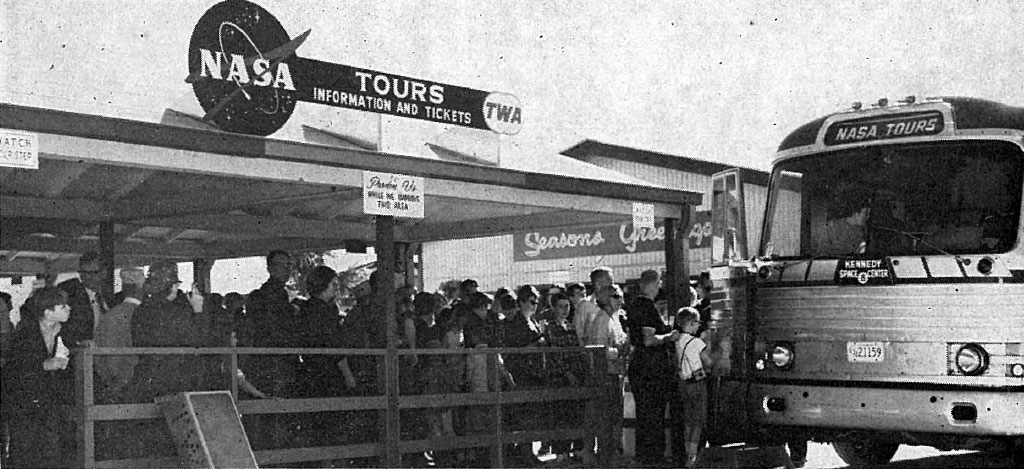
Bus tours were operated by TWA in the mid 1960s.

Beginning July 22, 1966, public tours were offered on 40-passenger buses. Operated by TWA, a 1.5-hour tour that included the Vehicle Assembly Building and a 3-hour tour including launch facilities were available. Tickets ranged from $0.50 for children 12 and under to $2.50 for adults for the longer tour. More than 1,500 people toured that first day and additional busses were quickly added to the fleet of former Greyhound buses. TWA continued operating tours through at least the bicentennial celebrations in 1976.

Visitor Information Complex, 1969

As NASA neared the Moon, popularity grew. By 1969, the visitor center was the second most visited Florida attraction, behind Tampa's Busch Gardens. Even during the gap between the Apollo and Space Shuttle programs, attendance remained at over one million guests and it ranked as the fifth most popular tourist attraction in Florida.

When nearby Walt Disney World opened in 1971, visitor center attendance increased by 30%, but the public was often disappointed by the comparative lack of polish at KSC's tourist facilities. Existing displays were largely made up of trade show exhibits donated by NASA contractors. Later that year, a $2.3 million upgrade of the visitor complex began with added focus on the benefits of space exploration along with the existing focus on human space exploration.

Visitor Complex in 1998

In 1995, Delaware North Companies was selected to operate the visitor center. Between 1995 and 2007, the visitors center went through many changes, including the improvement of restaurants, retail shops, buses, and new exhibits. It is also when the visitor complex got its current name, Kennedy Space Center Visitor Complex. Since then, the facility has been entirely self-supporting and receives no taxpayer or government funding. Kennedy Space Center Visitor Complex was voted the 8th best museum in the United States by Trip Advisor in 2016. The Visitor Complex has had a visitation increase in the 2010s, in part due to the addition of the Space Shuttle Atlantis on display, and the increasing interest in STEM fields for children. NASA renewed the contract with Delaware North Companies through 2028.

== Attractions ==
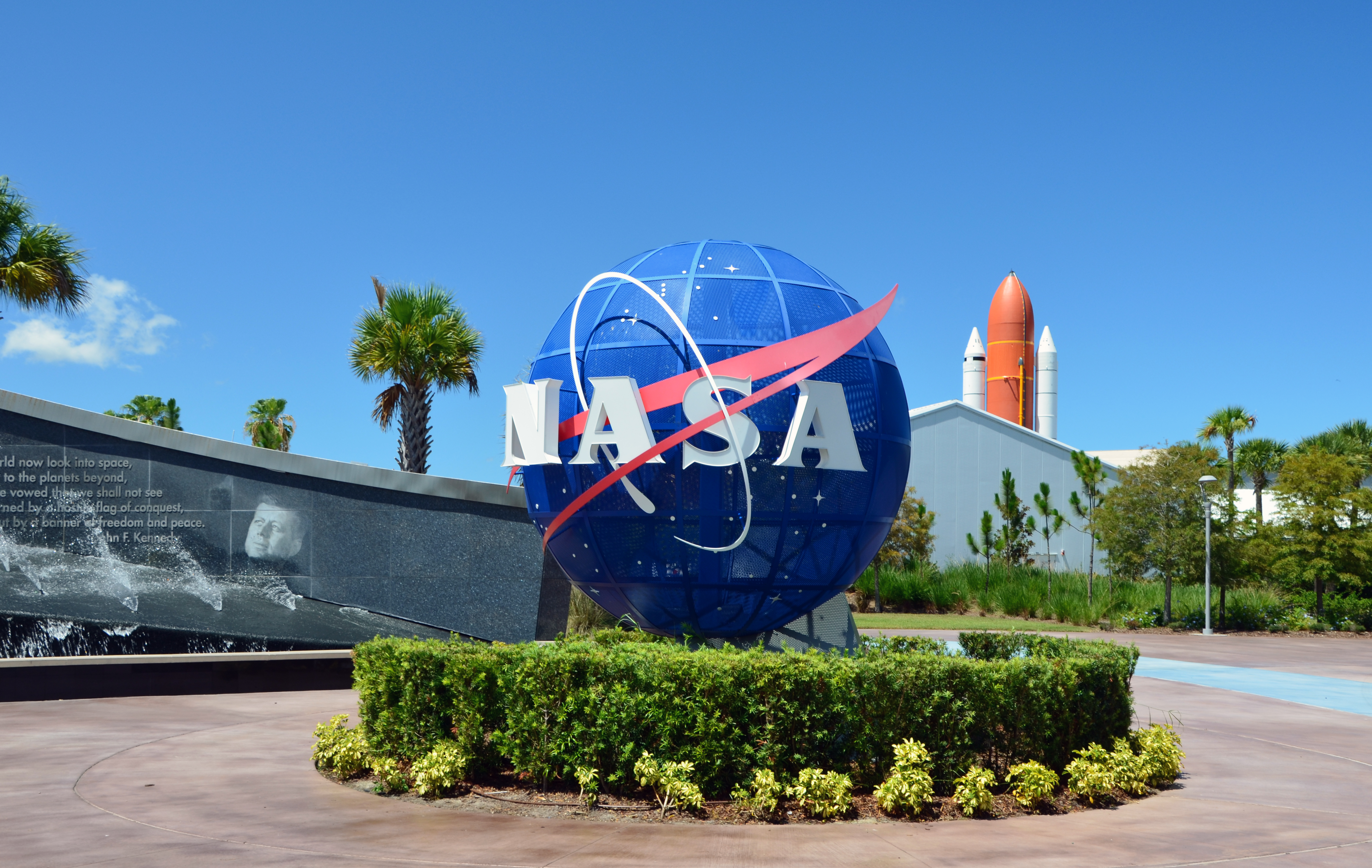
Entrance to Kennedy Space Center, the John F. Kennedy memorial and a Space Shuttle stack in the background

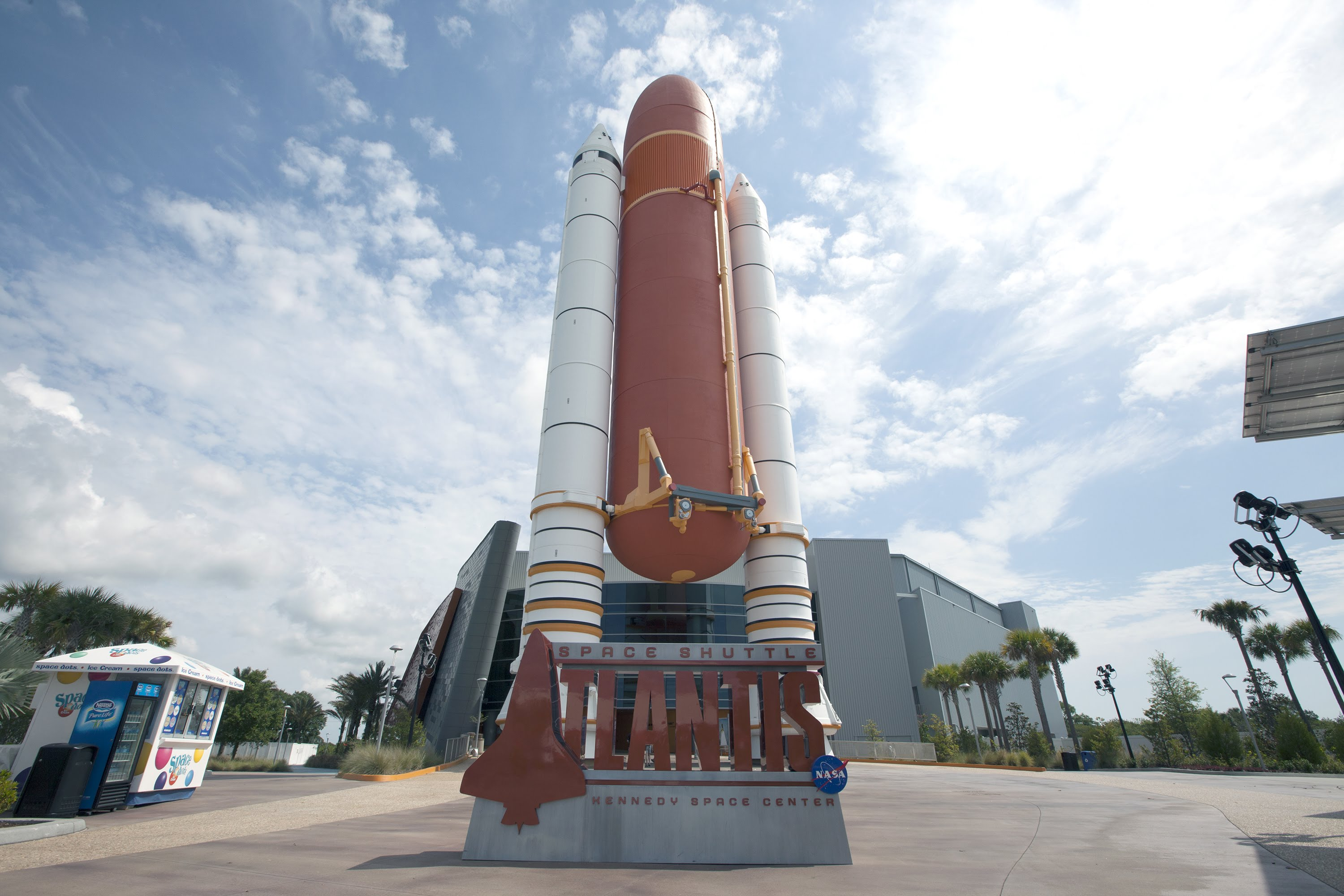
A Space Shuttle stack in front of the Space Shuttle Atlantis Exhibit building

Included in the base admission is tour-bus transportation to Launch Complex 39 and the surrounding KSC property, and the Apollo/Saturn V Center. Previously, it also included admission to the Astronaut Hall of Fame, 6 miles (9.7 km) to the west. That building is now closed and the U.S. Astronaut Hall of Fame resides in a new exhibit at the visitor complex, Heroes & Legends. Since summer of 2025, the bus tour includes a visit to a four-story observation tower The Gantry at LC-39, which provides a 360° view of the entire site with launch pads, and visitors are able to take part in various interactive experiences at the Earth Information Center. An outdoor playground is available as well.

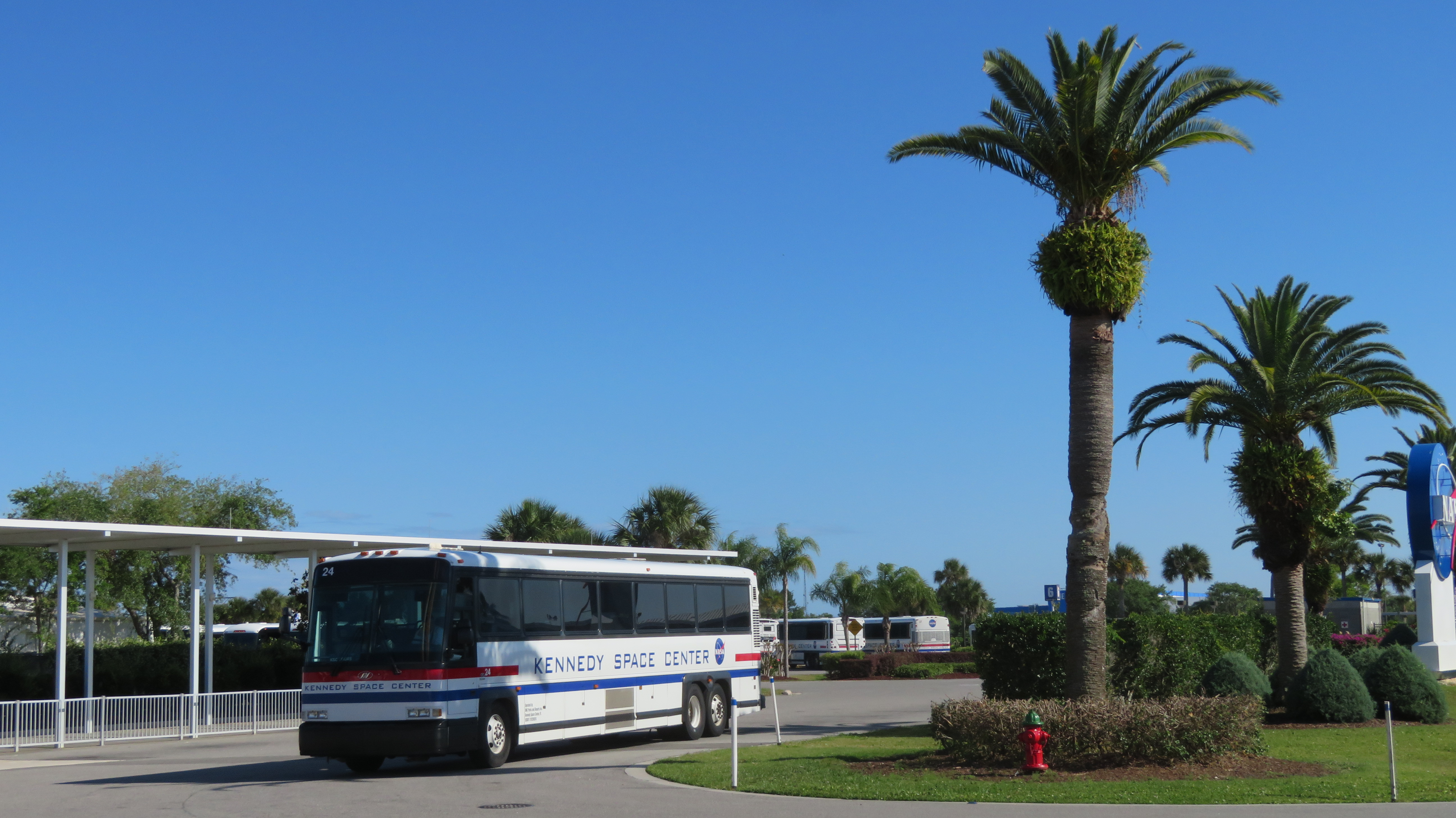
Buses carry visitors from the visitor complex to Launch Complex 39 and to the Banana Creek launch viewing area behind the Apollo/Saturn V Center.

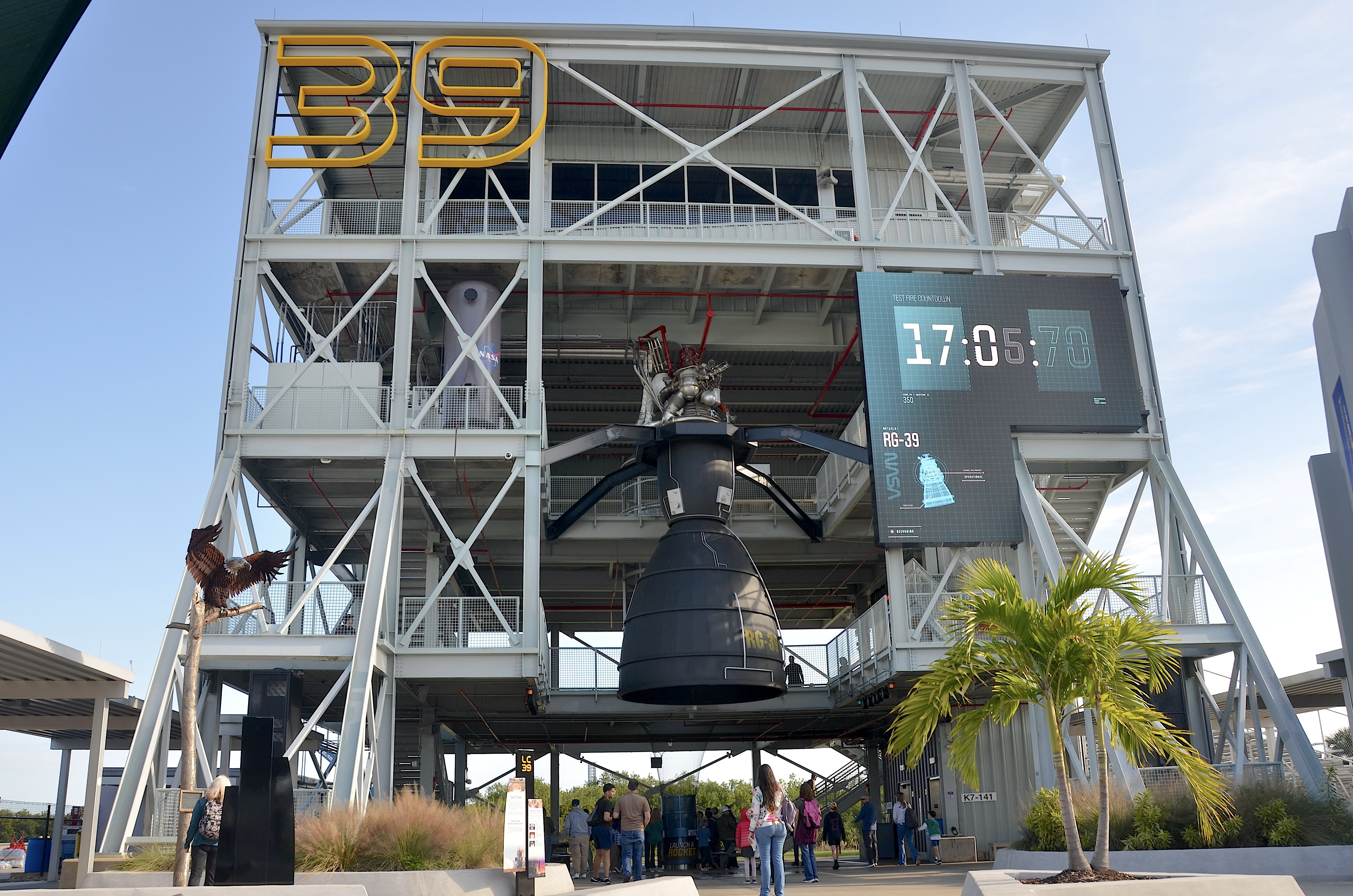
The Gantry at LC-39

The Apollo/Saturn V Center, located 6 miles (9.7 km) north inside NASA's gates, is a large museum built around its centerpiece exhibit, a restored Saturn V launch vehicle, and features other space related exhibits, including an Apollo capsule. Two theaters allow the visitor to relive parts of the Apollo program. One simulates the environment inside an Apollo firing room during an Apollo launch, and another simulates the Apollo 11 Moon landing. The tour formerly included the Space Station Processing Facility (SSPF) where modules for the International Space Station were tested.

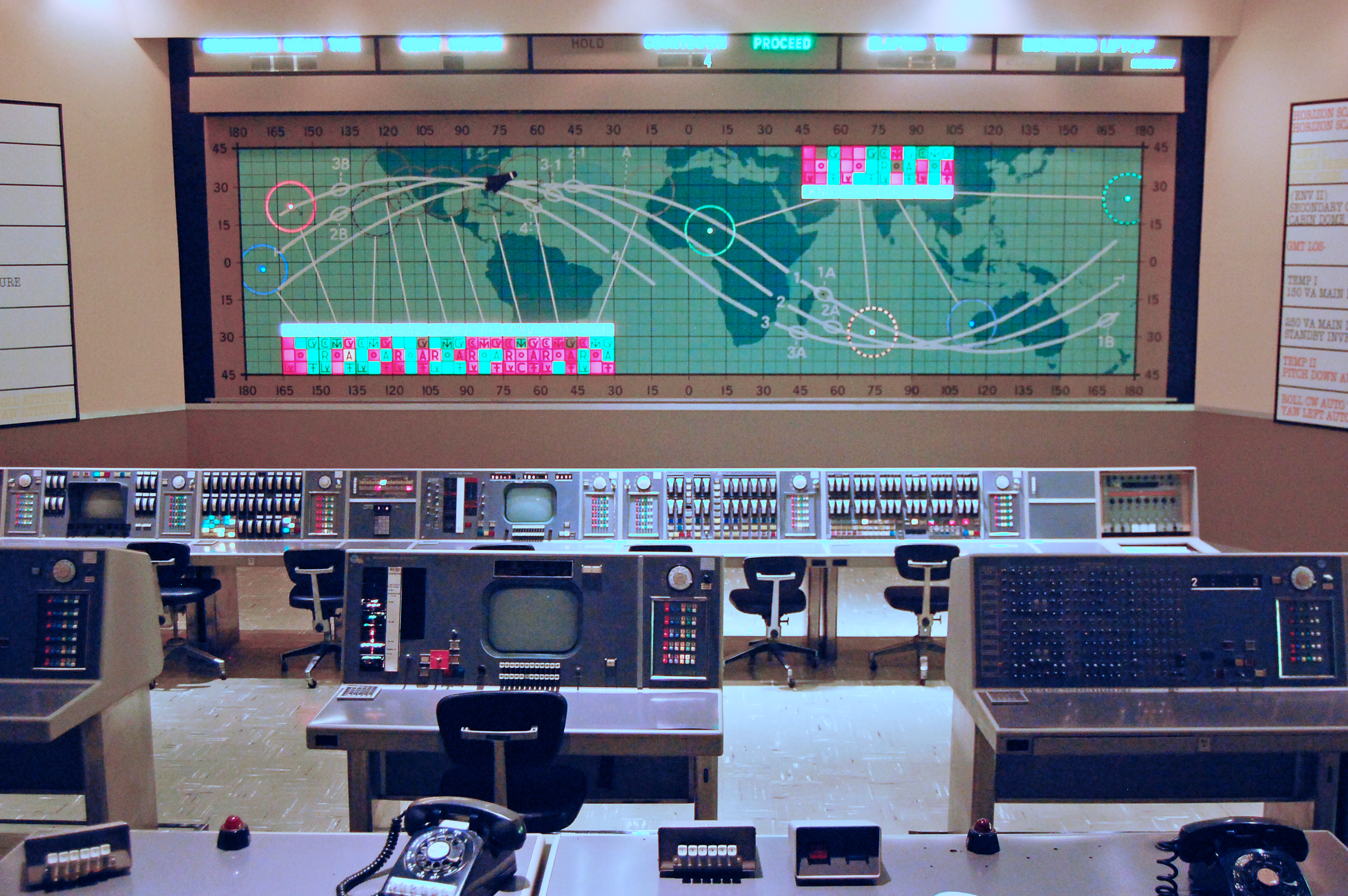
Mercury Control consoles in Heroes & Legends

The Visitor Complex includes two facilities run by the Astronauts Memorial Foundation. The most visible of these is the Space Mirror Memorial, also known as the Astronaut Memorial, a huge black granite mirror through-engraved with the names of all astronauts who died in the line of duty. Elsewhere on the Visitor Complex grounds is the foundation's Center for Space Education, which includes a resource center for teachers, among other facilities; and the Kurt Debus Conference Center.

Heroes & Legends, which replaced the previous Early Space Exploration exhibit, houses the U.S. Astronaut Hall of Fame and several displays of artifacts. Among them is the Gemini 9A spacecraft, as well as a recreation of the Mercury Control Center using consoles and furniture relocated from the original building at Cape Canaveral Space Force Station. These were previously housed in the Mercury Mission Control facility, which was on the National Register of Historic Places, but it was demolished in May 2010 due to concerns about asbestos and the estimated $5-million cost to renovate the building after 40 years of exposure to salt air.

=== Space Shuttle Atlantis ===
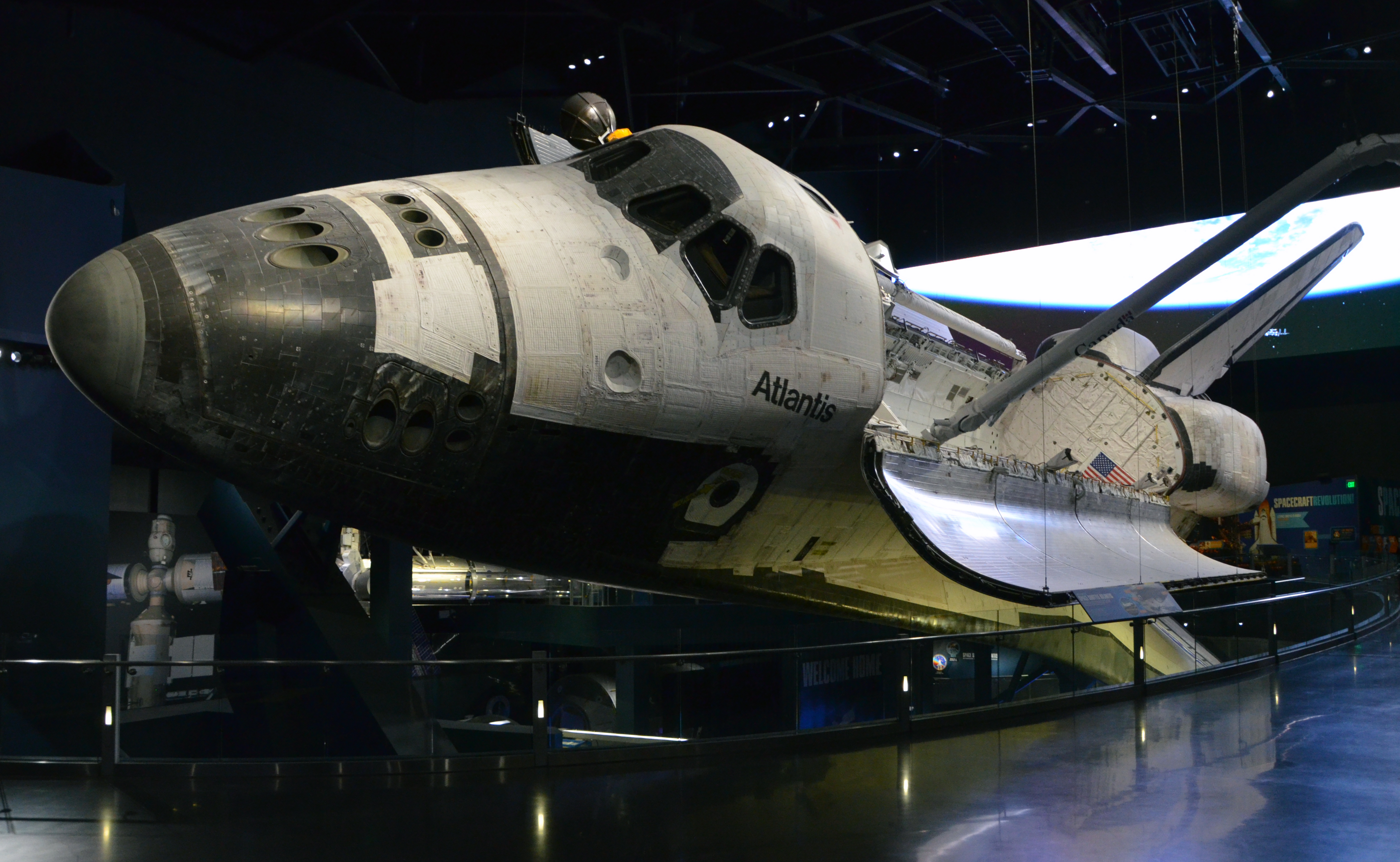
Atlantis display

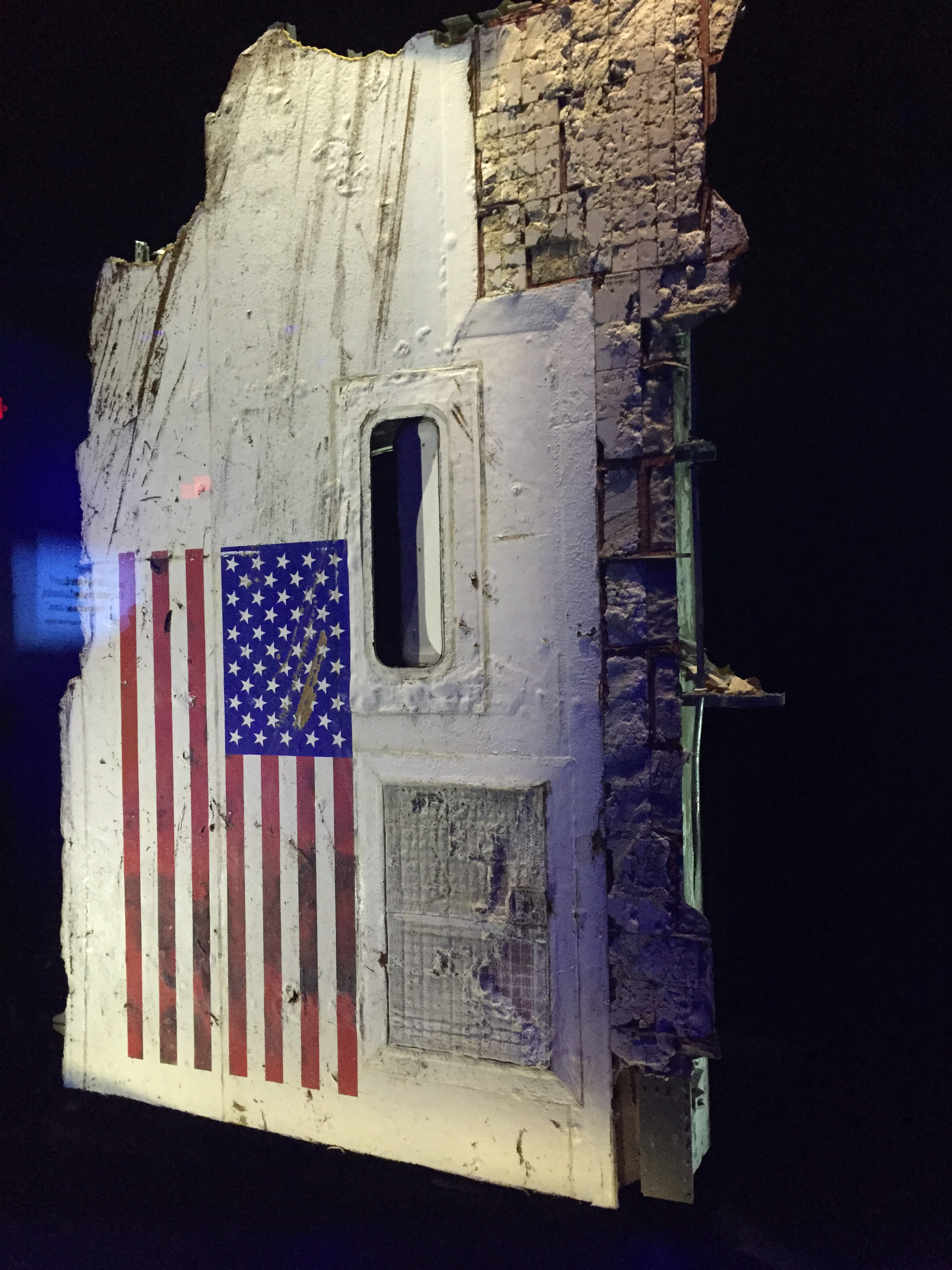
A recovered piece of Challenger on display in Forever Remembered

In 2010, the center announced a US$100 million plan to house a retired Space Shuttle orbiter in a 10-story 64,000 ft^{2} (5,900 m^{2}) facility. On April 12, 2011, the 30th anniversary of the launch of STS-1, NASA announced that Space Shuttle Atlantis would be provided to the visitors center for display after its last flight on STS-135 and subsequent decommissioning. The exhibit officially opened on June 29, 2013, offering a nearly 360° view of the shuttle. Atlantis is positioned at a 43.21° angle with the payload bay doors open; a view only previously seen in space.

The exhibit also includes a life sized replica of the Hubble Space Telescope, the Shuttle program's astrovan, Dr. Maxime Faget's Shuttle prototype from 1969, a large-scale slide mimicking the 22° slope of a Space Shuttle when landing, numerous astronaut training and Shuttle simulators, and other displays about life in space. On the ground level is the "Forever Remembered" exhibit, commemorating the 14 astronauts lost in both Space Shuttle Challenger and Space Shuttle Columbia disasters. "Forever Remembered" includes personal artifacts from the astronauts, two recovered pieces of the Shuttles, footage of the physical and emotional recovery, and the return to flight.

This exhibit replaced the Space Shuttle Explorer which was a full-scale, high-fidelity replica of the Space Shuttle which visitors were able to board. Explorer was removed from the KSC Visitor Center on December 11, 2011, and relocated to the Vehicle Assembly Building's turn basin dock adjacent to the Launch Complex 39 Press Site. The vehicle remained at the turn basin until 2012, when it was moved to the Space Center Houston.

=== Shuttle Launch Experience ===
The Shuttle Launch Experience, designed by Bob Rogers and the design team BRC Imagination Arts, opened May 25, 2007. The attraction puts guests through a simulated Shuttle launch, in which they are directed into a replica module, turned upright, and shaken to replicate engine launch. Delaware North Companies invested six years and US$60 million into the attraction. Astronauts, NASA experts and attraction-industry leaders were consulted during development. The attraction is housed in a 44,000 sq ft (4,100 m^{2}) building that holds four simulators, each accommodating 44 people. Former Shuttle commander and then NASA administrator Charles F. Bolden narrates the simulation and hosts the prerecorded pre-show. In the attraction's early years, guests would enter from the outside and exit into a gift shop before heading back out to the Visitor Complex. In 2013, however, the attraction was later made part of the exhibit for the Space Shuttle Atlantis, with the former gift shop space being used for several simulators that allowed guests to try their hand at landing and docking the Space Shuttle.

=== Heroes & Legends ===
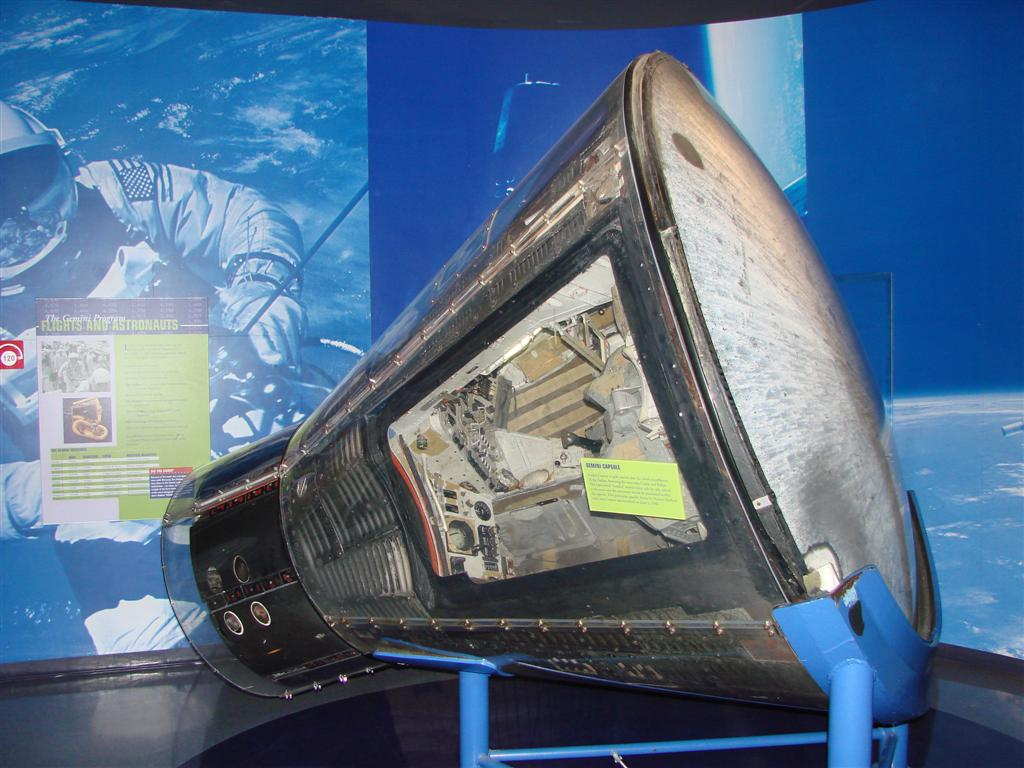
The Gemini 9A space capsule, flown in 1966 by Thomas P. Stafford and Eugene Cernan

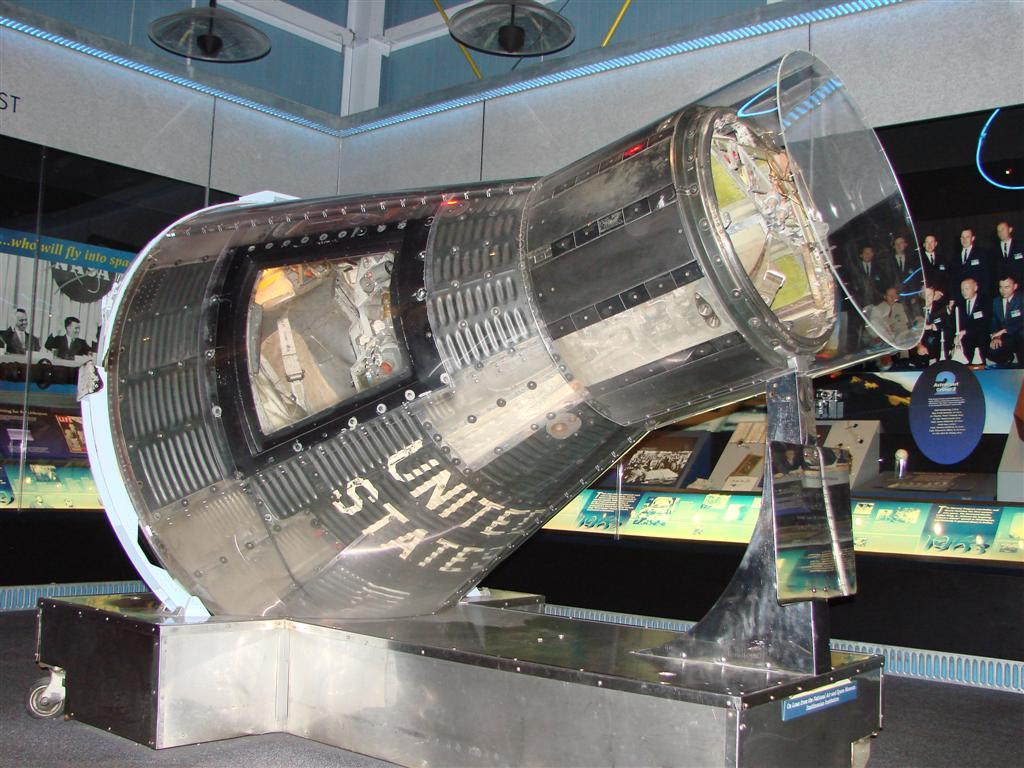
Sigma 7, flown in 1962 by Wally Schirra and shown on display in 2007, is now exhibited at Heroes & Legends.

The United States Astronaut Hall of Fame is now located in Heroes & Legends, which replaced the previous Early Space Exploration exhibit inside the visitor complex's main entrance. The US$20 million exhibit, which opened in 2016, focuses on America's first astronauts and nine characteristics of a hero. Each characteristic features astronaut artifacts and multimedia relevant to that characteristic. Key artifacts include the 1966 Gemini 9A capsule flown by Thomas P. Stafford and Eugene Cernan, the original NASA emblem from the Mercury Control Center (1959), the control center from Project Mercury (remaining from Early Space Exploration), Mercury Redstone rocket MR-6 (likely intended for Deke Slayton), and Wally Schirra's 1962 Sigma 7 capsule. There are also artifacts from specific astronauts, such as Gus Grissom's suborbital flight suit from July 21, 1961.

Heroes & Legends also holds the U.S. Astronaut Hall of Fame, displaying the inducted men and women. In the center of the hall is an interactive kiosk with an inductee database, a mission index, and a virtual photo opportunity with the Mercury 7 astronauts.

The Boeing company is the title sponsor of Heroes & Legends, which marked the first time the visitor complex entered an agreement with a corporate sponsor in more than 50 years.

==== U.S. Astronaut Hall of Fame ====
The United States Astronaut Hall of Fame, located inside the Heroes & Legends building, is included with visitor complex daily admission. The Hall of Fame was previously owned and operated by the U.S. Space Camp Foundation, but was purchased at auction by Delaware North Park Services in September 2002 on behalf of NASA. The building was renamed the ATX Center and houses educational programs including Camp Kennedy Space Center and the Astronaut Training Experience.

=== Rocket Garden ===
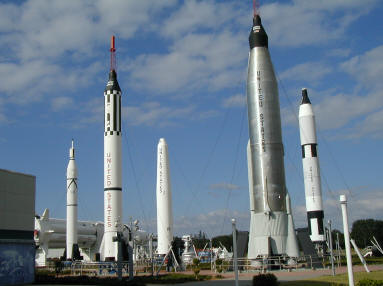
Rocket garden in 2004 (l-r): Juno I, Mercury-Redstone, Thor (top missing), Mercury-Atlas (re-creation replica), Gemini-Titan II, with Saturn IB in background

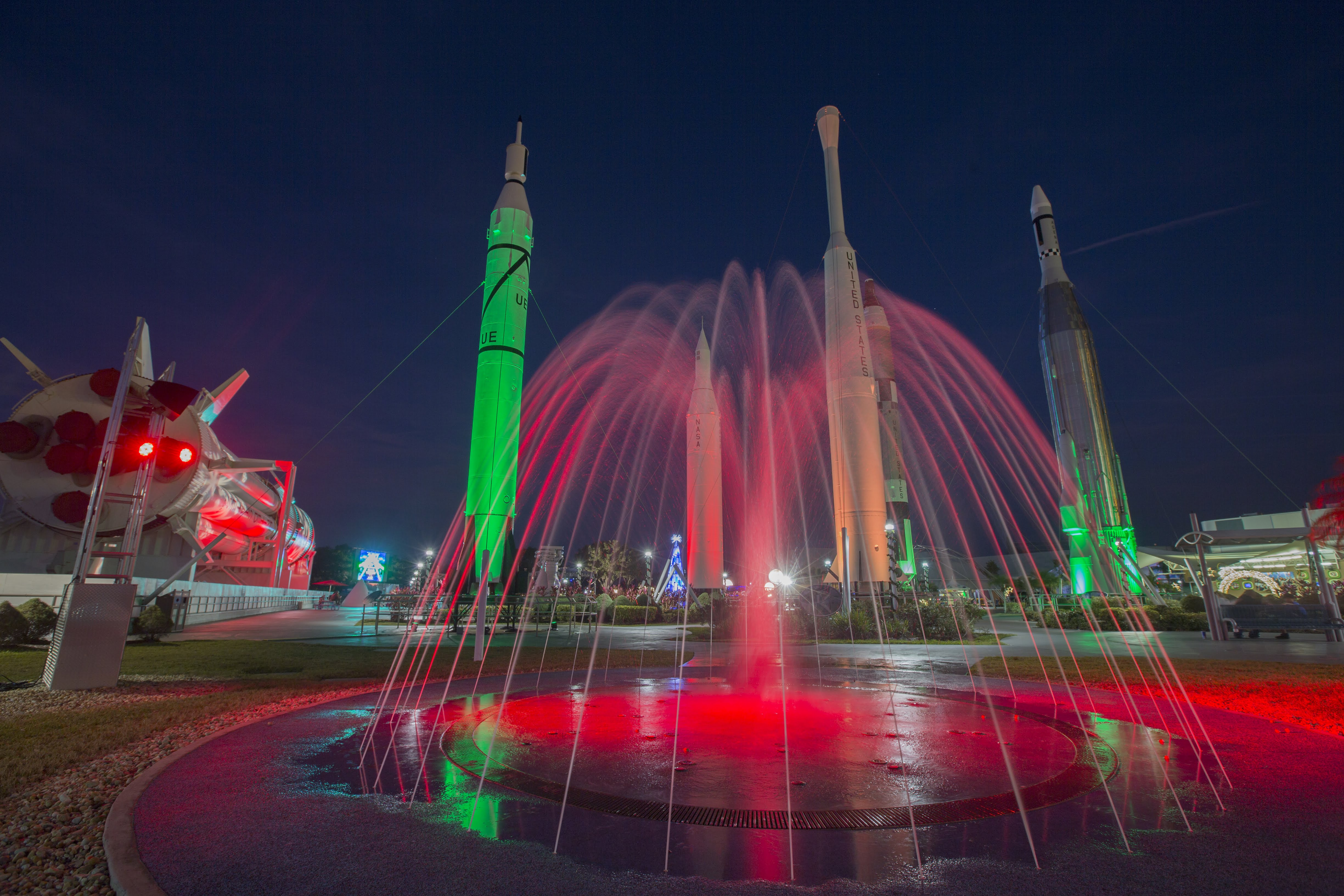
The rocket garden during Christmas

The Rocket Garden is located inside the front entrance, beyond Heroes & Legends. It is an outdoor display of historic rockets that put Americans and satellites in space. Visitors can walk up to and around the base of the rockets. All of the rockets in the garden are functional articles with the exception of the Mercury-Atlas, which is a replica. The Mercury-Redstone, Mercury-Atlas, and Titan II rockets launched astronauts and the Juno I, Juno II, Thor-Delta, and Atlas-Agena rockets launched satellites from Cape Canaveral. These are mounted upright whereas the largest rocket, a Saturn IB, is mounted on its side. Saturn IB rockets launched Apollo Command/Service Modules into Earth orbit for Apollo, Skylab, and the Apollo–Soyuz Test Project. The Saturn IB was restored in 2018. In March 2021, a Delta II launch vehicle was added to the Rocket Garden.

The Juno I on display is painted with serial number "UE", a reference to the vehicle that launched the first U.S. satellite, Explorer 1. A Juno II launched the first American probe to escape Earth's gravity and fly past the Moon. Atlas-Agena rockets launched early probes to the Moon, Venus, and Mars, as well as the Agena target vehicles used in rendezvous and docking by Gemini spacecraft — a necessary technique for the following Apollo missions. The Thor-Delta was one of the most reliable and frequently used launch vehicles. The Titan II on display is a refurbished Air Force ICBM with a replica Gemini spacecraft, painted to resemble the Gemini 3 booster. It was rescued from the Arizona Boneyard and erected in 2010 to replace a deteriorating mockup composed of two first stages which had been on display for more than 20 years. The Saturn IB on display is SA-209 which was designated for a possible Skylab Rescue mission.

The garden also features mock-ups of capsules from the Mercury, Gemini, and Apollo programs that visitors can get in. An F-1 rocket engine that powered the first stage of the Saturn V is also on display. Free guided tours of the garden are available daily.

In June 2019, visitor complex official Therrin Protze offered placement of a Falcon 9 or Falcon Heavy booster in the garden to SpaceX: "We have the space available and the capability to make it happen". SpaceX chief executive Elon Musk responded expressing interest in the offer.

==== Rocket Garden gallery ====
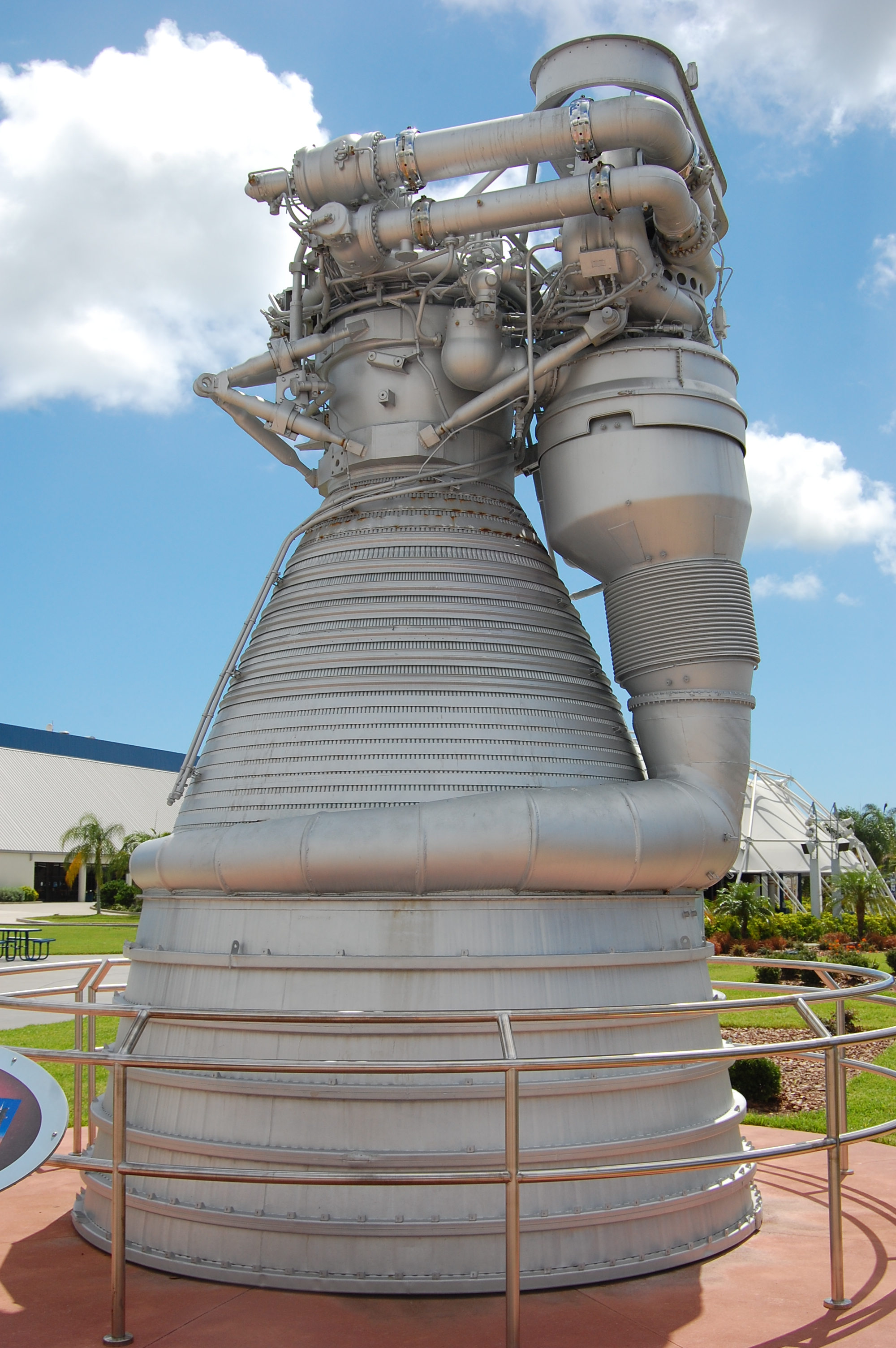
F-1 rocket engine for the Saturn V

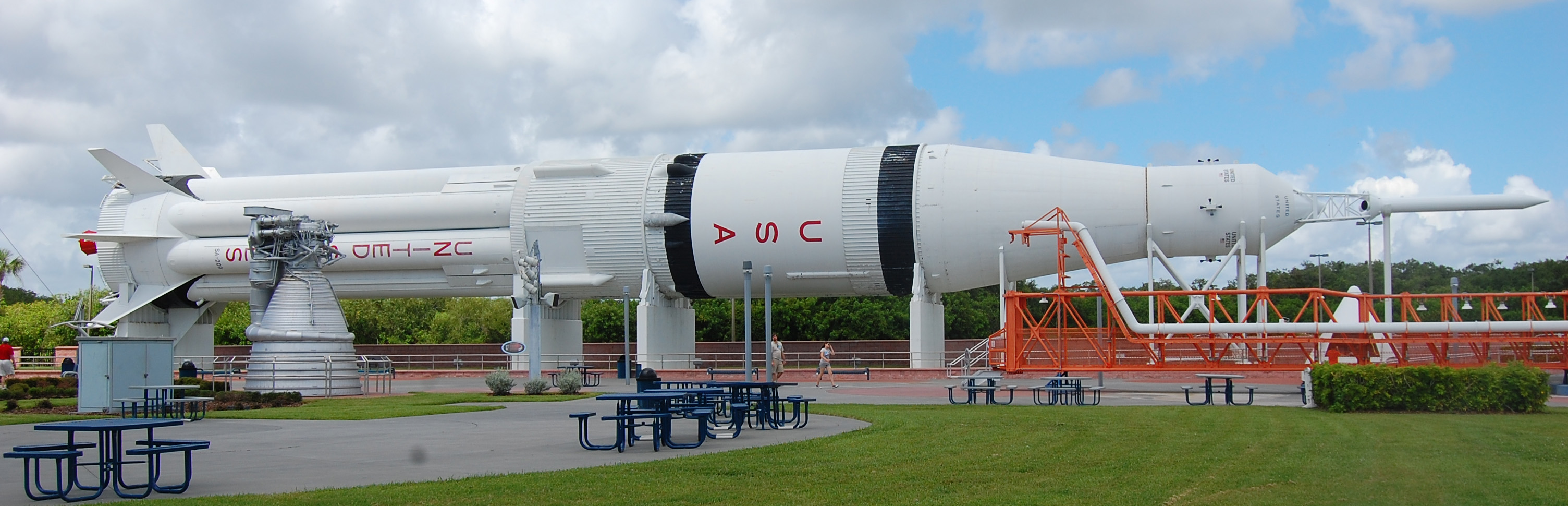
Saturn IB (SA-209)

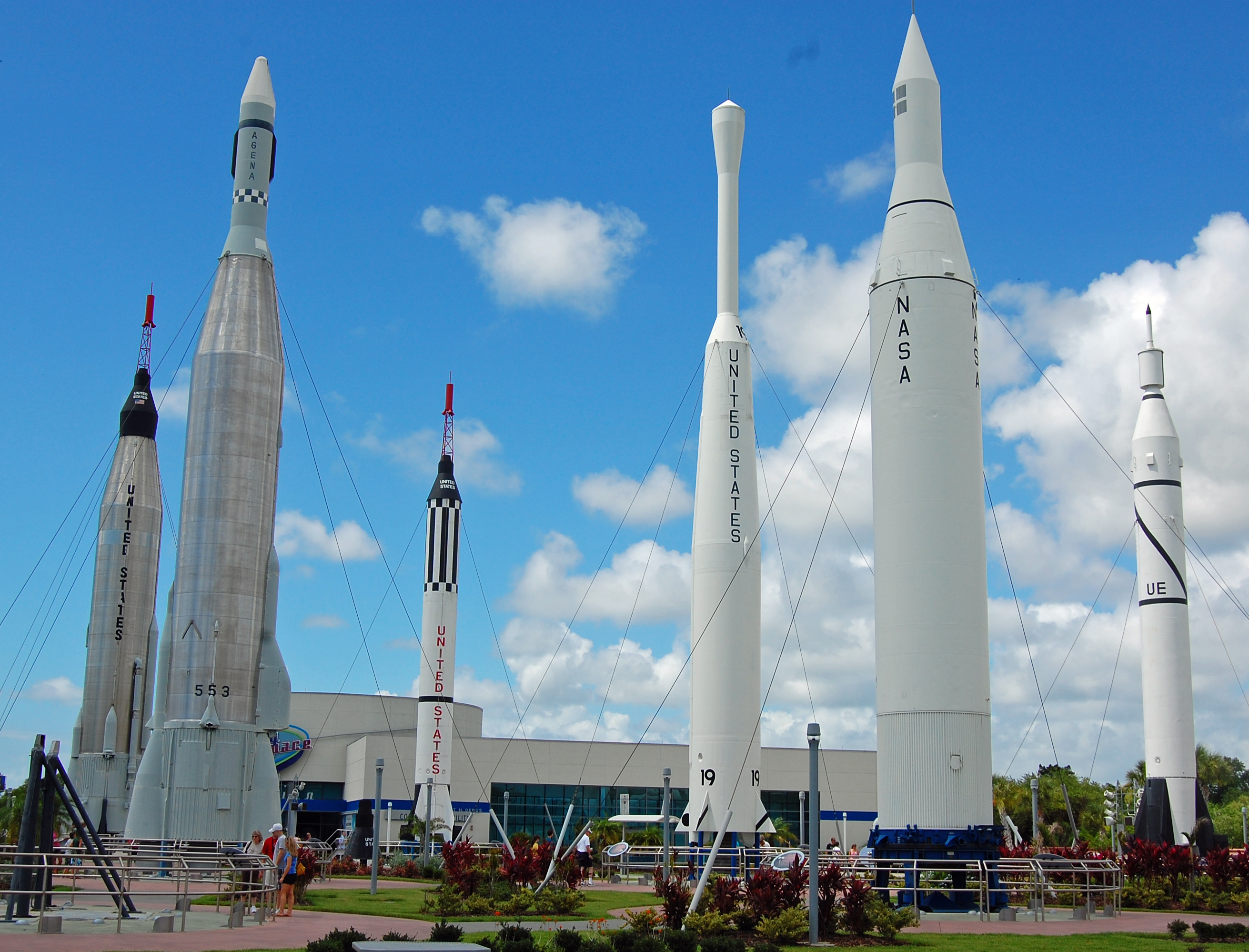
KSC rocket garden (left to right): Mercury-Atlas, Atlas-Agena, Mercury-Redstone, Thor-Able, Juno II, Juno I

=== Gateway ===
Subtitled "The Deep Space Launch Complex", this attraction opened in the spring of 2022 and showcases hardware focused on future exploration. Items on display include a Falcon Heavy booster, the Exploration Flight Test-1 capsule, prototypes of other spacecraft considered for flight, and interactive exhibits related to trips beyond the Moon. The facility hosts a rotating set of three shows devoted to topics such as extra-solar planets, Mars or recent discoveries in deep space.

=== Apollo/Saturn V Center ===
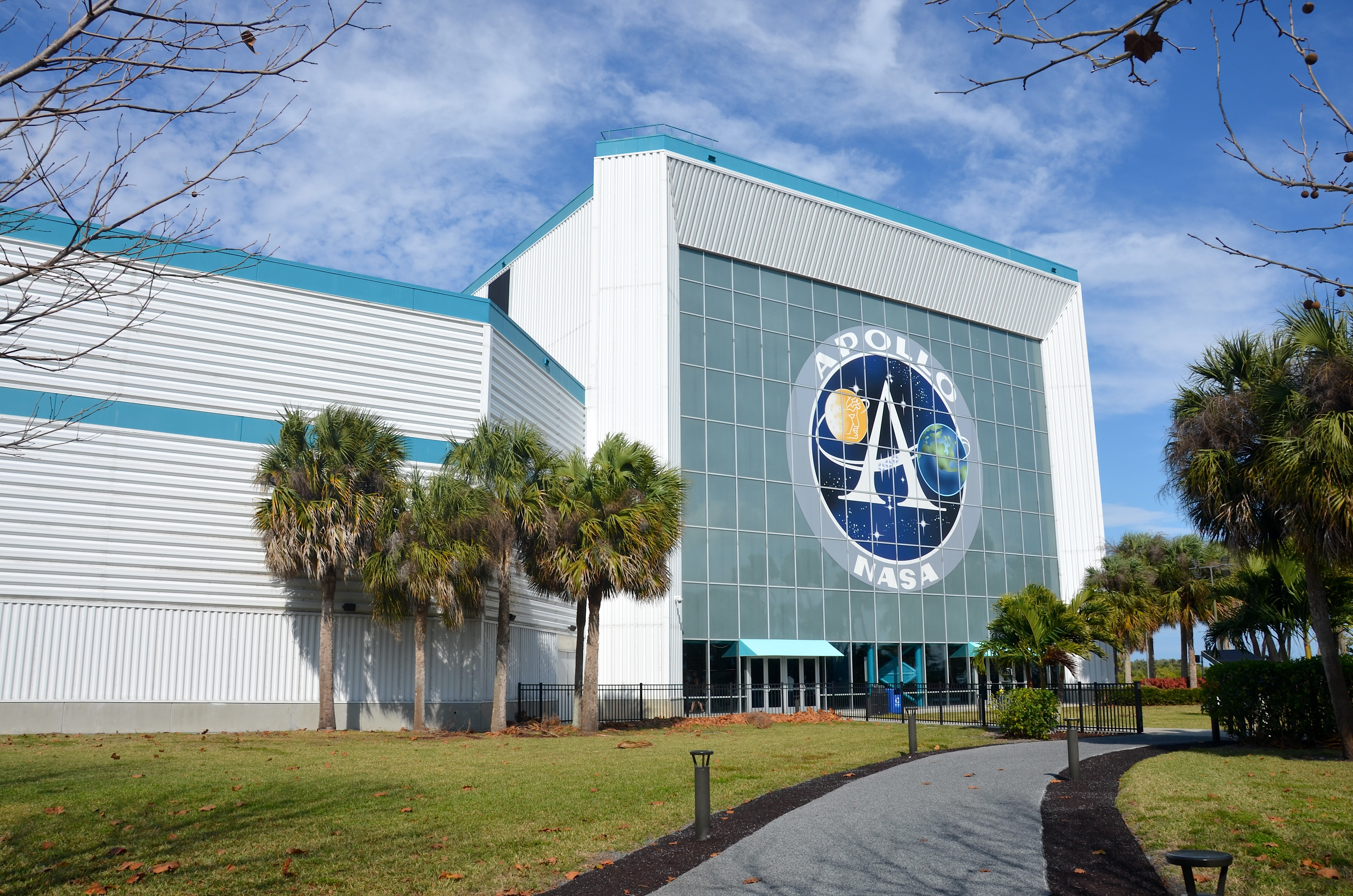
Apollo/Saturn V Center 2026

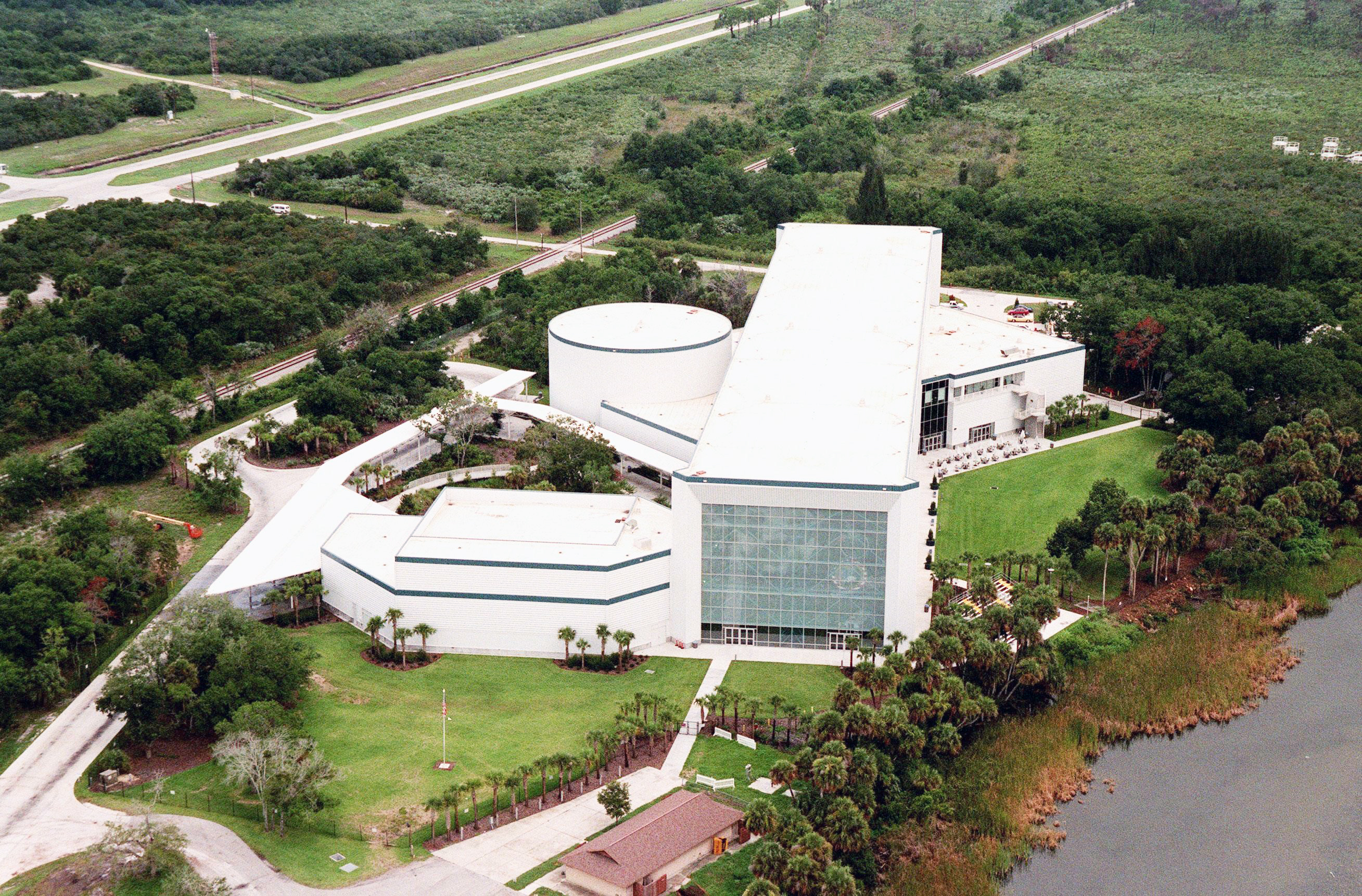
Aerial view of the Apollo/Saturn V Center from 1998

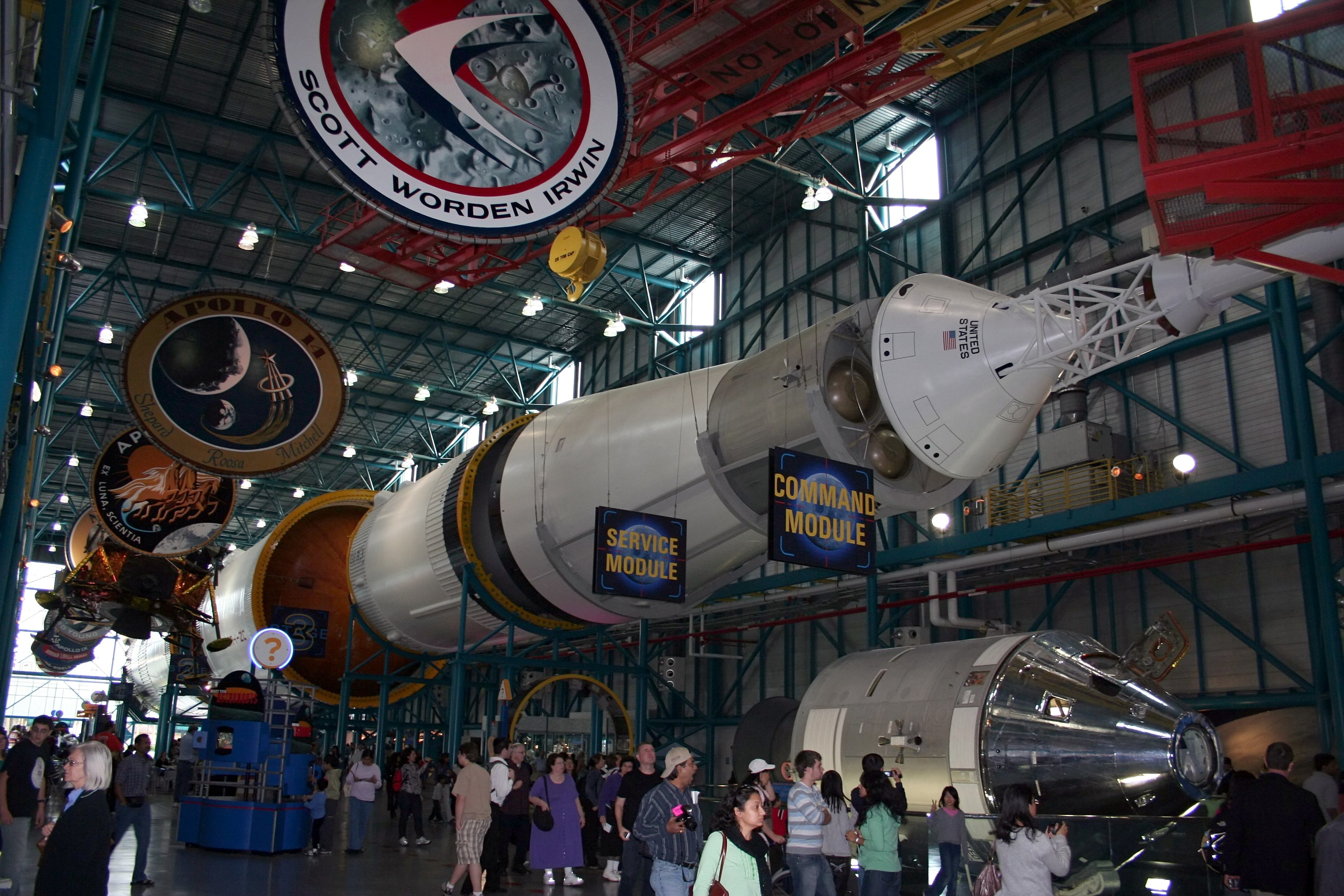
The Saturn V launch vehicle is displayed horizontally, its engines at the left and the command module at its top on the right. Above it hangs large circular logos of each of the Apollo missions.

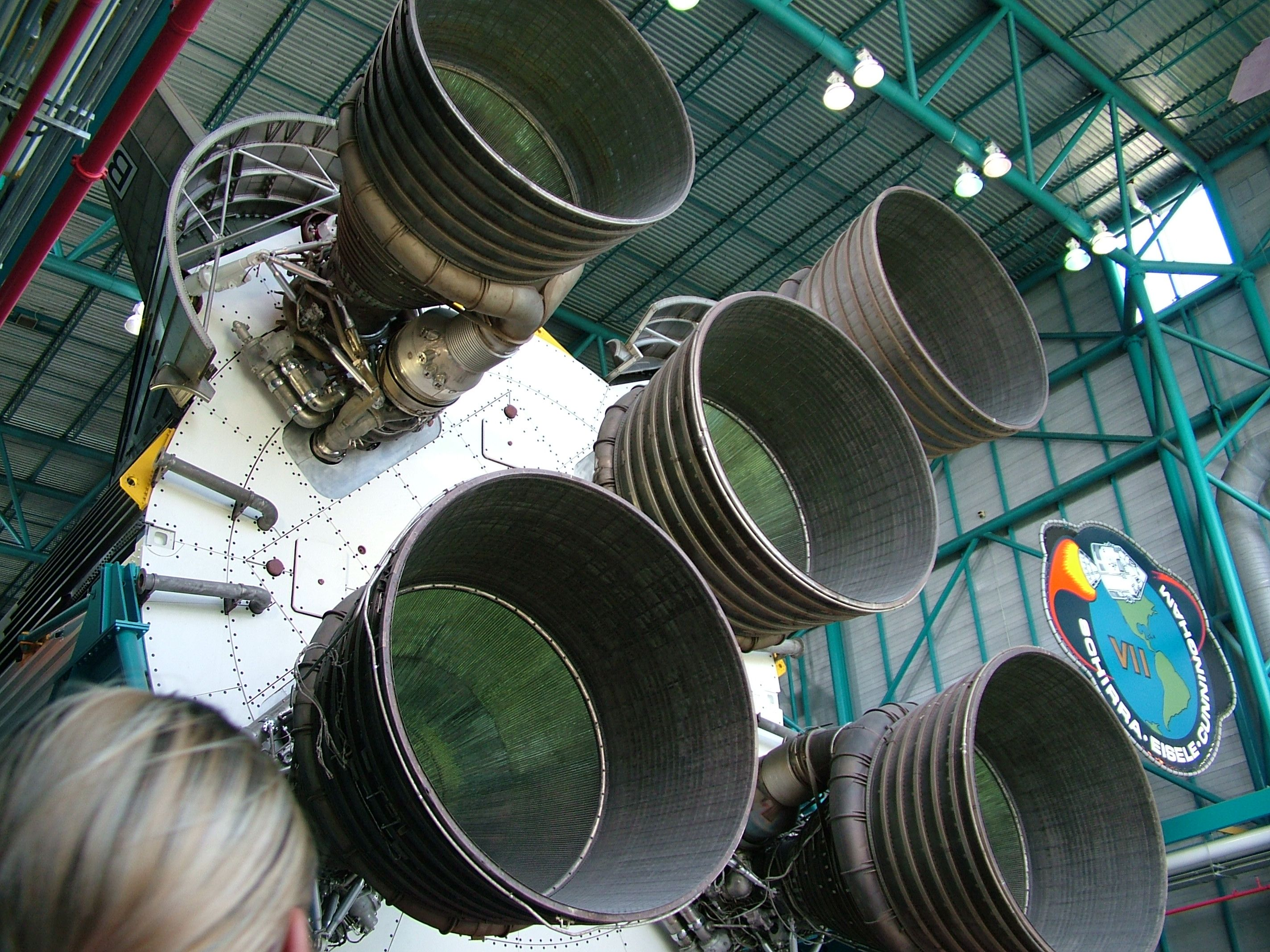
Rear view of Saturn V at the Apollo/Saturn V Center

The Apollo/Saturn V Center (28.6055°N 80.6696°W) is located north-northwest of Launch Complex 39 on the Kennedy Parkway N near the Shuttle Landing Facility and is only accessible to visitors by bus tours from the Visitors Complex. The center, which opened December 17, 1996, was designed by Bob Rogers and the design team BRC Imagination Arts, for NASA and Delaware North Companies. The opening of the exhibit was historic for NASA as it was the first large exhibit to be opened inside a restricted area, only accessible by Kennedy Space Center tour buses.

The 100,000-square-foot facility was built to house a restored Saturn V launch vehicle and features other exhibits related to the Apollo program. Until the structure was built, the Saturn V was displayed horizontally for many years outdoors just south of the Vehicle Assembly Building and tour buses brought visitors to it.

Other exhibits include the Apollo 14 command module Kitty Hawk, which carried Alan Shepard, Stuart Roosa, and Edgar Mitchell to the Moon in 1971 and orbited it 34 times, during which Shepard and Mitchell made the third crewed lunar landing; an unused Apollo command and service module Skylab Rescue (CSM-119), and an unused Lunar Module (LM-9). CSM-119 was designated for a possible Skylab rescue mission and as a backup for the Apollo–Soyuz Test Project. LM-9 was originally scheduled to be used on Apollo 15, but when missions after Apollo 17 were canceled, a later LM (LM-10) was used instead.

Also on display is a slice of Moon rock that visitors can touch. Other exhibits include a replica of the Lunar Roving Vehicle, a variety of space suits including Alan Shepard's Apollo 14 extravehicular suit, a piece of Apollo 13's Lunar Module returned by the astronauts, lunar samples from Apollo 15 and Apollo 17, and a large cut-away scale model of the Saturn V. Two theaters allow visitors to relive parts of the Apollo program – one simulates the environment inside an Apollo-era firing room during the launch of Apollo 8 and the other simulates the Apollo 11 landing.

In January 2017, "Ad Astra Per Aspera – A Rough Road Leads to the Stars" opened in the Apollo/Saturn V Center to commemorate the fallen astronauts of Apollo 1. The permanent tribute showcases personal memorabilia from the three astronauts, with photos and video from their professional and personal lives. The exhibit also displays the charred three-section Block I hatch from the fire, and a redesigned Block II hatch. The Block II hatch flew on all following Apollo missions that could open quicker in the event of an emergency.

==== Apollo/Saturn V Center gallery ====
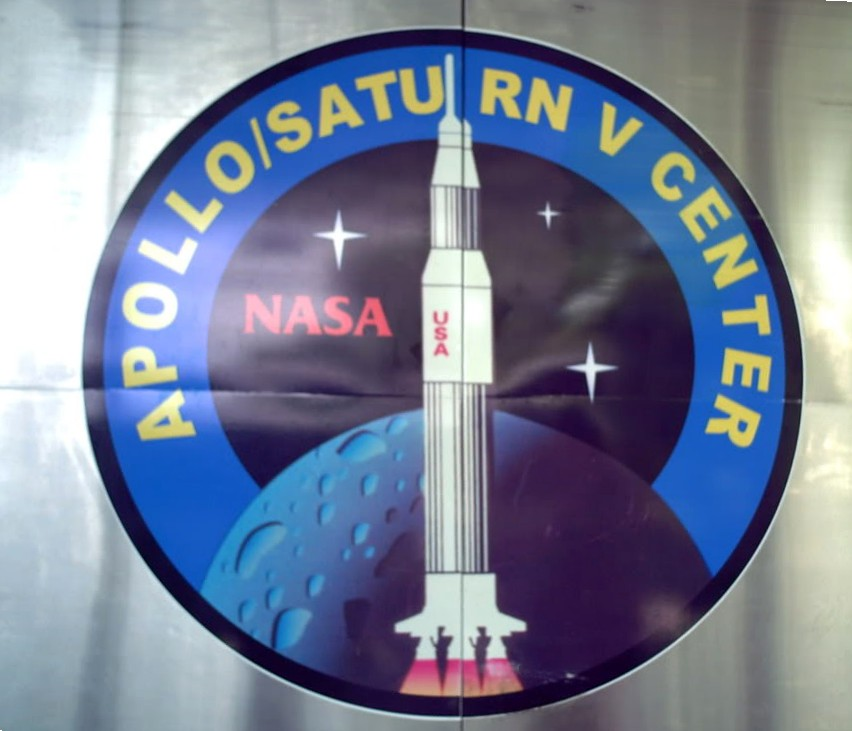
Center emblem

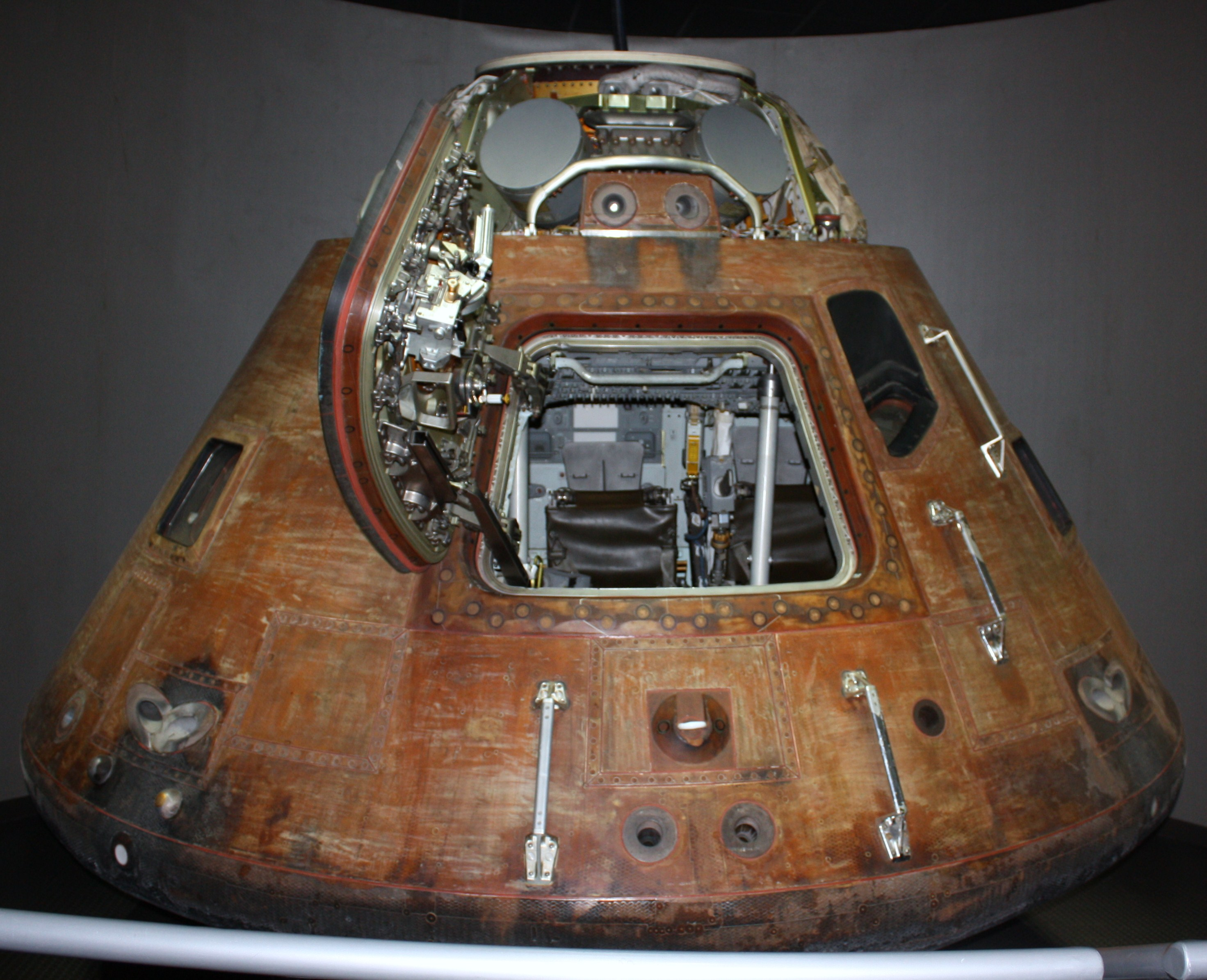
Apollo 14 Command Module Kitty Hawk

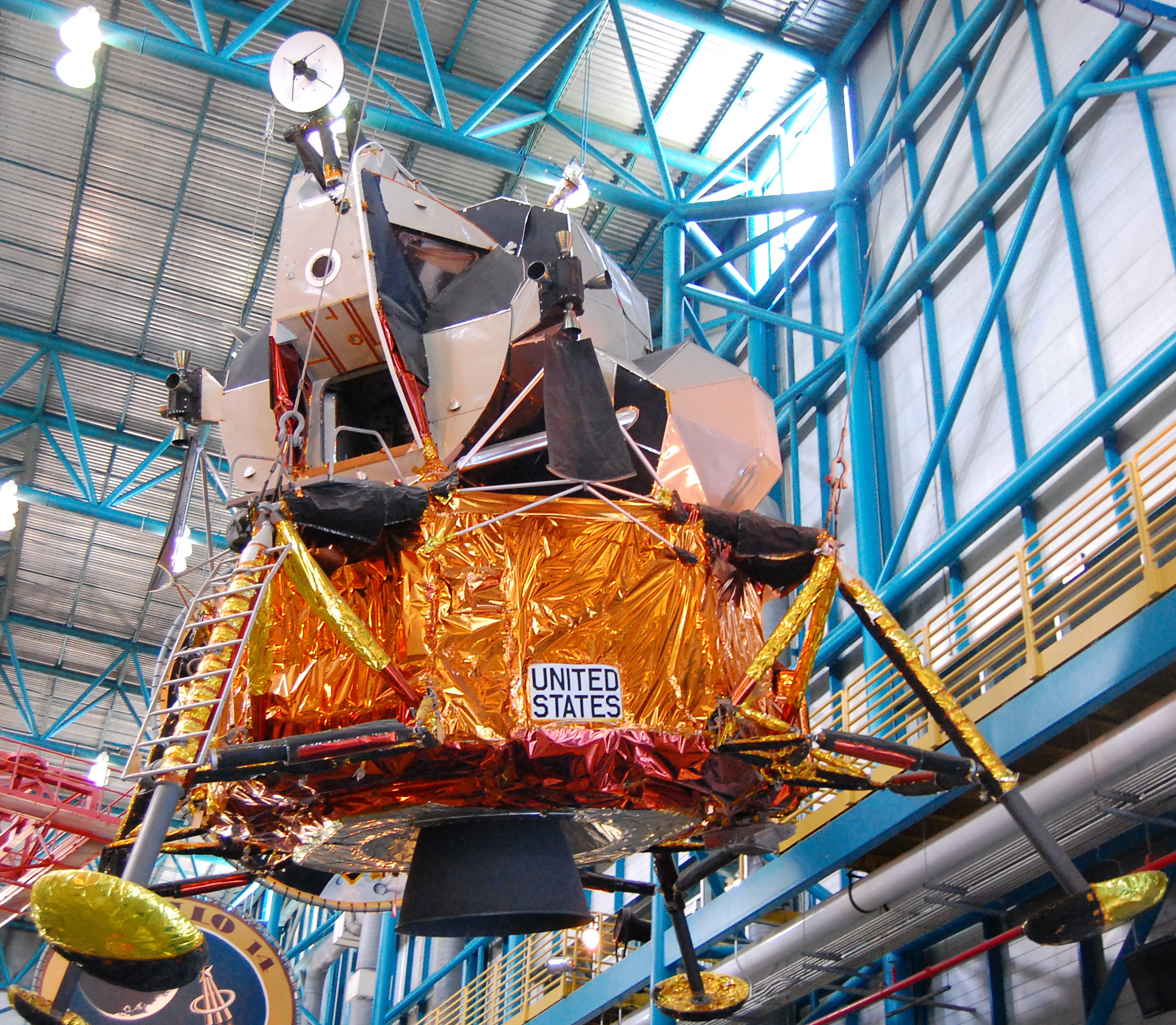
Apollo Lunar Module (LM-9)

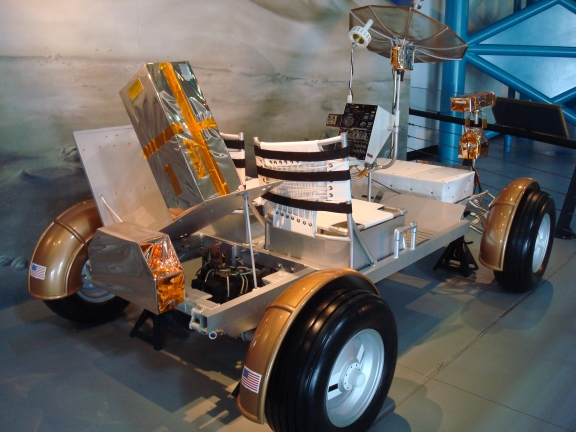
Lunar Roving Vehicle test car

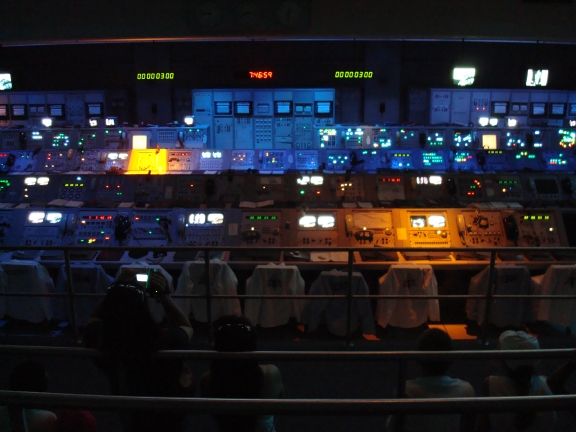
Launch control mock-up

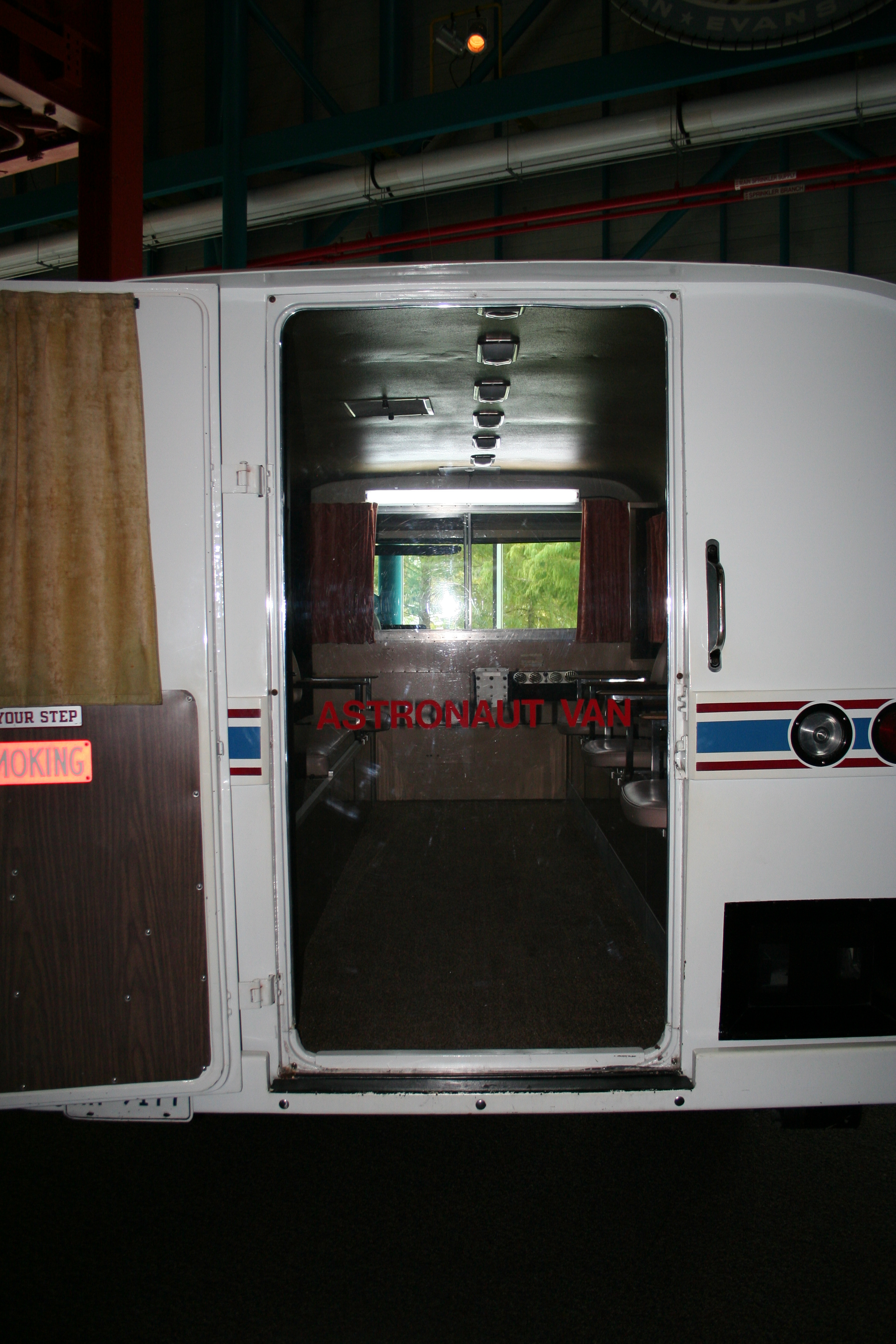
Apollo astronaut van

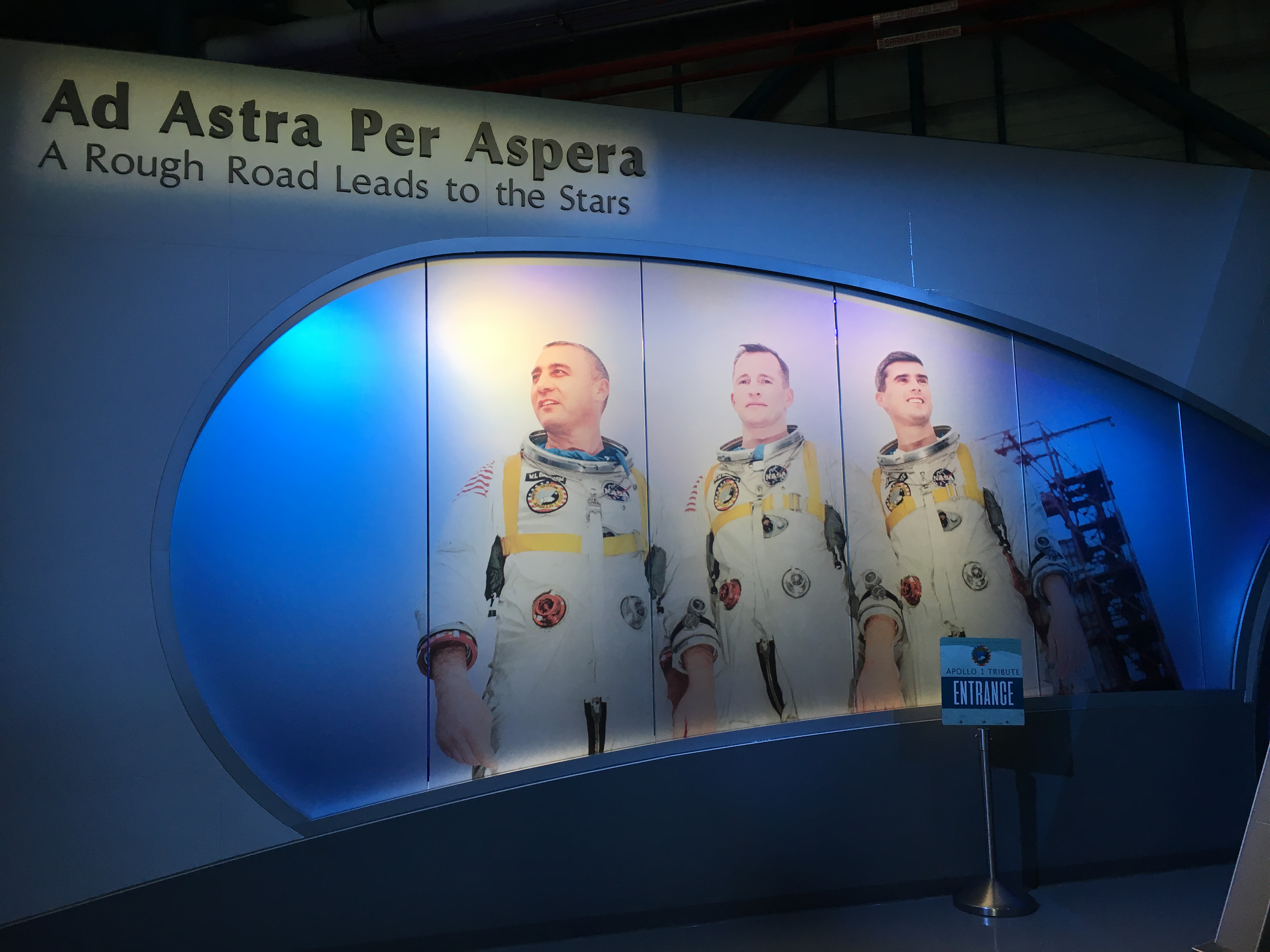
"Ad Astra Per Aspera – A Rough Road Leads to the Stars"

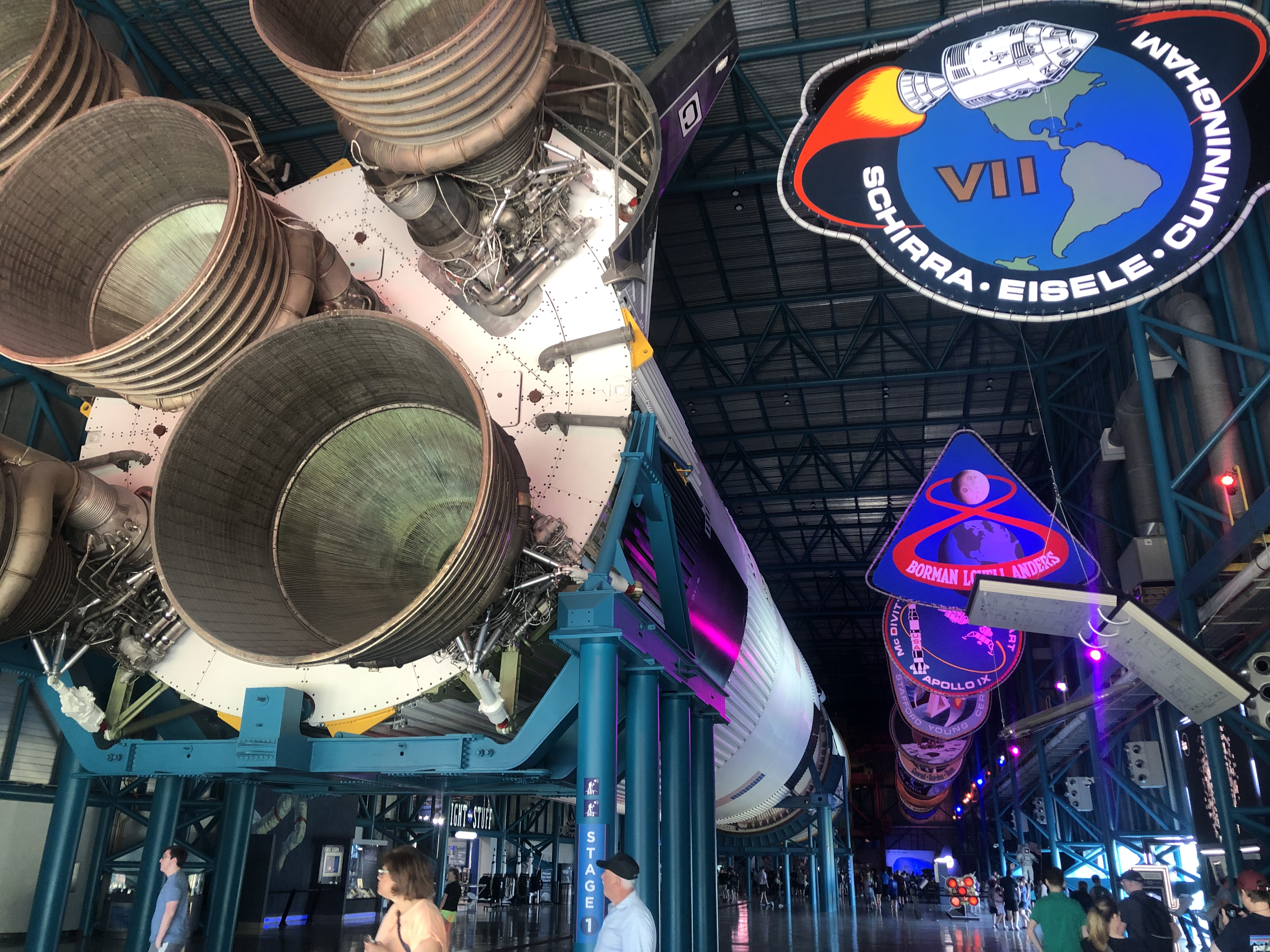
Saturn V with mission seals on right

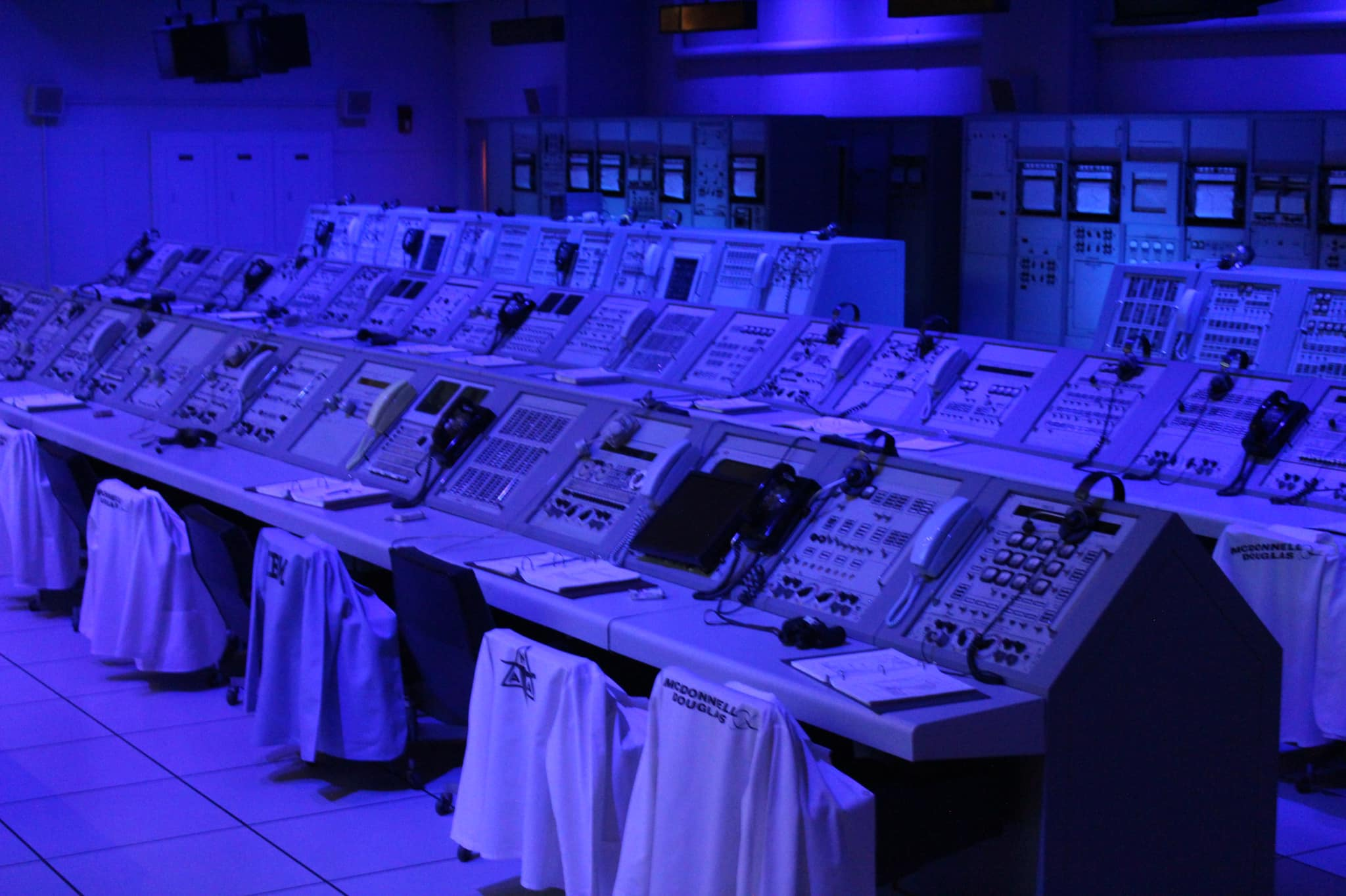
A mockup of the Apollo 11 control center

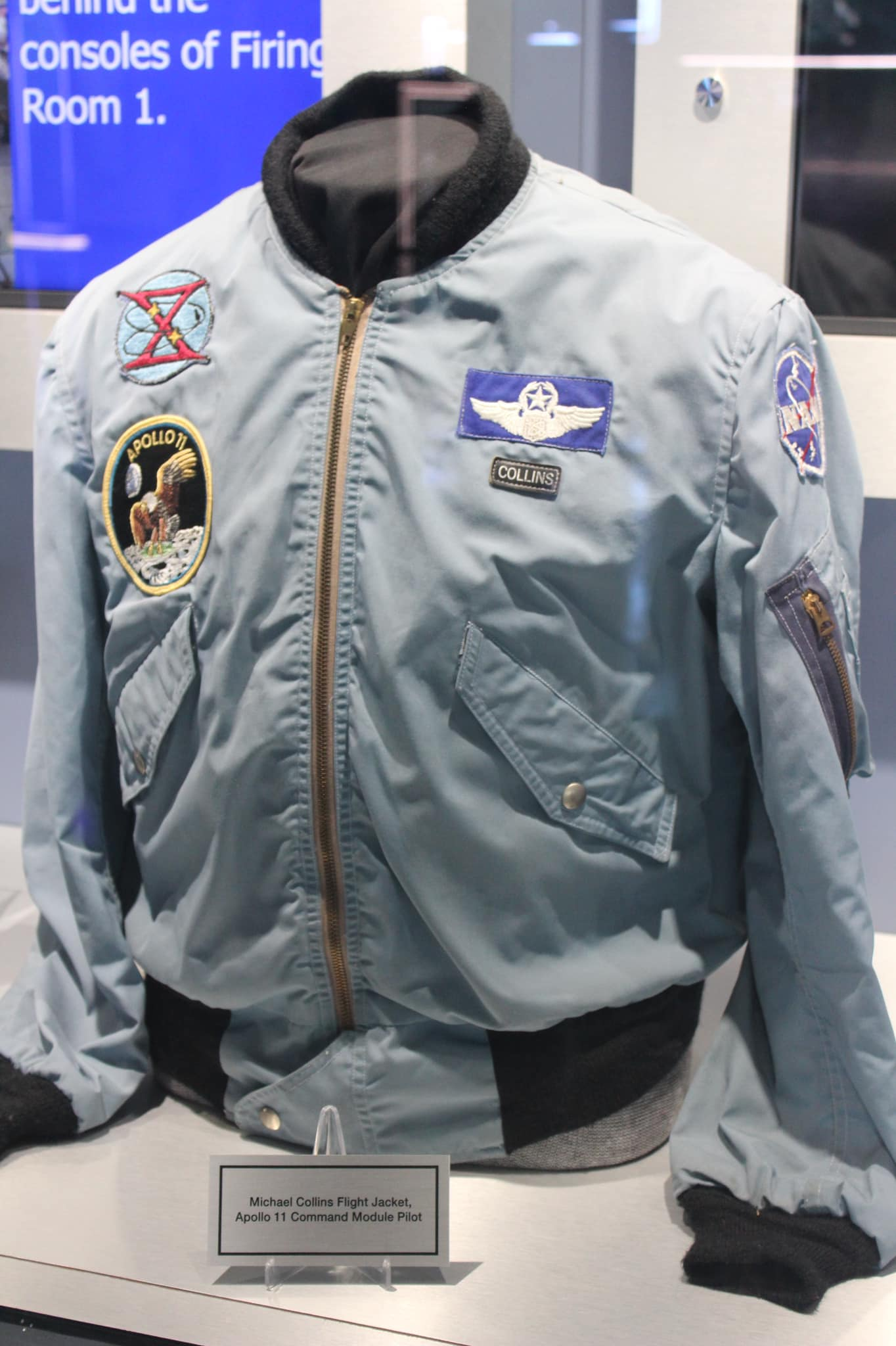
The jacket worn by Michael Collins featuring patches for Apollo 11 and other missions he flew on

=== Journey to Mars: Explorers Wanted ===
Facilities and geographic features of Kennedy Space Center
Facilities and geographical features of Kennedy Space Center:
1 Launch Complex 39 (LC-39A)
2 Launch Complex 39 (LC-39B)
3 Vehicle Assembly Building
4 Shuttle Landing Facility
5 Kennedy Space Center Visitor Complex
6 Apollo/Saturn V Center
7 Banana River
8 Indian River
9 KSC Headquarters Building
10 Astronaut Beach House
11 Banana Creek
12 Cochran Cove
13 Operations and Checkout Building
14 Launch Complex 48
15 SpaceX Roberts Road Operations Center
16 Exploration Park
17 Blue Origin Ransom Road facility
18 Crawlerway
19 Launch Control Center
20 Orbiter Processing Facilities 1 and 2
21 Orbiter Processing Facility 3
22 Launch Complex 39 Press Site
23 Multi-Payload Processing Facility
24 Space Systems Processing Facility
25 NASA Railroad (Wilson Junction)

In 2010, the attraction Exploration Space; Explorers Wanted, also designed by BRC Imagination Arts, functioned as part immersive experience, and part futuristic recruitment center. It is now known as Journey to Mars: Explorers Wanted with a focus on Mars exploration. The attraction, which employs large-scale video projections, dimensional exhibits and interactive experiences, is designed to immerse visitors into the adventure and unsolved challenges of future space exploration. The exhibit includes orbital docking and lunar landing simulators, a full-sized development model of a crew vehicle, a model of a space exploration vehicle, and models of the Mars rover family: Curiosity, Spirit, Opportunity, and Sojourner.

=== NASA Now ===
NASA Now is an exhibit that has a revolving display of spacecraft from NASA and its commercial partners. NASA Now, as of summer 2017, has the space-flown Orion EFT-1 designed for NASA's Space Launch System (SLS) and a scale model of an SLS launch vehicle. There is also a full-scale model of the crew vehicle Boeing CST-100 Starliner. SpaceX's space-flown Dragon capsule from COTS-2, which is the first commercial vehicle to dock with the International Space Station (ISS), is also featured. A pressure vessel for CST-100 Starliner, a scale model of the Dream Chaser cargo vehicle from Sierra Nevada Corporation, a scale model of United Launch Alliance's Atlas V launch vehicle, and a Vector-R rocket from Vector Space Systems are also all in the exhibit. NASA Now is located inside the IMAX theater.

=== Space Mirror Memorial ===
The Space Mirror Memorial, also known as the Astronaut Memorial, is maintained by the Astronauts Memorial Foundation and is located behind the IMAX theater on the grounds of the main Visitor Complex. It honors NASA astronauts along with several military and civilian astronauts who have died in the line of duty.

=== Planet Play ===
The Planet Play attraction is a multi-story, highly immersive play structure geared towards children between the ages of 2-12. It opened to the public on January 1, 2021, and features various amenities such as climbing structures, slides, interactive games, and light projections, with the intention of educating children on some of the technologies used in space exploration.

=== Step. Power. Launch. ===
Step. Power. Launch. is an attraction where visitors jump on pressure pads to power up a rocket on a screen. There are three sections: Earth, Moon And Mars. When the rocket is completely fueled up, smoke begins to spew from beneath the screen and a launch sequence is shown. In recent years the pressure pads were removed while the two screens remain.

=== IMAX Theater (Planet Play building) ===
This IMAX theater, located inside the Planet Play building, shows two films: Journey to Space and Asteroid Hunters.

=== Robot Scouts (closed) ===
In 1999, the attraction "Robot Scouts" opened as a walk-through exhibit highlighting NASA's unmanned planetary robot probes. The attraction, designed originally by award-winning experience designer Bob Rogers (designer) and the design team BRC Imagination Arts, explores how robots help to pave the way for human spaceflight. During their visit, guests were guided through the attraction by a robot named StarQuester 2000, who explained to them the mission of the "Robot Scouts: Trailblazers for Human Exploration", with the help of the other then-active robots, including the Voyagers, the Vikings, Cassini, and even the Hubble Space Telescope. The experience culminated in a visit to a diorama of a Mars base, which even included a simulated Martian sunset. The attraction is now closed, and replaced by a new more enhanced and activity-packed scout program.

=== Early Space Exploration (closed) ===
In 1996, "Early Space Exploration" opened as an exhibit at the Kennedy Space Center in the far corner of the Rocket Garden near where the Visitor Complex's current entrance is now. As its name suggests, this exhibit celebrates the early years of American space exploration, with TVs displaying news broadcasts from the 1960s that described the events of certain flights as well as other memorabilia commemorating the time. The exhibit also featured the actual consoles from the Mercury Mission Control Center. This exhibit was closed in 2014 and transformed into Heroes & Legends, with many of the items from the original Astronaut Hall of Fame relocated to here. The Mercury Mission Control Consoles were also kept from the aforementioned exhibit.

== Special events and programs ==
The Visitors Complex also hosts special ticketed events run by Delaware North. Naturalization ceremonies have been conducted in the Rocket Garden. Space Shuttle launch viewing was offered and now rocket launch viewing, from the visitor complex, offering close views of the launch pads. The U.S. Astronaut Hall of Fame hosts a yearly induction ceremony. The Astronaut Training Experience is also offered by Delaware North at the Astronaut Training Experience Center with several full-sized mock-ups of the Space Shuttle, Mission Control and training hardware. The complex also runs week-long accredited day camps for children in grades 2–9. The visitor complex offers events all year, ranging from astronaut presentations and signing opportunities, special guest appearances, and anniversary celebrations.

The music video for "Walking on the Moon" by The Police was shot at the Kennedy Space Center on October 23, 1979. It features the band members miming to the track amidst spacecraft displays, interspersed with NASA footage. Stewart Copeland strikes his drumsticks on a Saturn V Moon rocket. Also, the music video for the 1992 Eurodance song "Rhythm is a Dancer" by Snap! was filmed at Kennedy Space Center Visitor Complex's rocket garden.

=== ISS space sky laser ===
On December 4, 2014 the ISS Space Sky Laser, a high-power laser light projection system primarily used at the Kennedy Space Center Visitor Complex, was used as a neon green beacon aimed at the International Space Station for 12 hours straight, just before the Delta IV rocket launch that carried Orion EFT-1 into space.

== See also ==
- Air Force Space and Missile Museum
- Cape Canaveral Space Force Station
- United States Astronaut Hall of Fame
- Florida tourism industry
