= Space Florida =

Aerospace economic development agency of the state of Florida

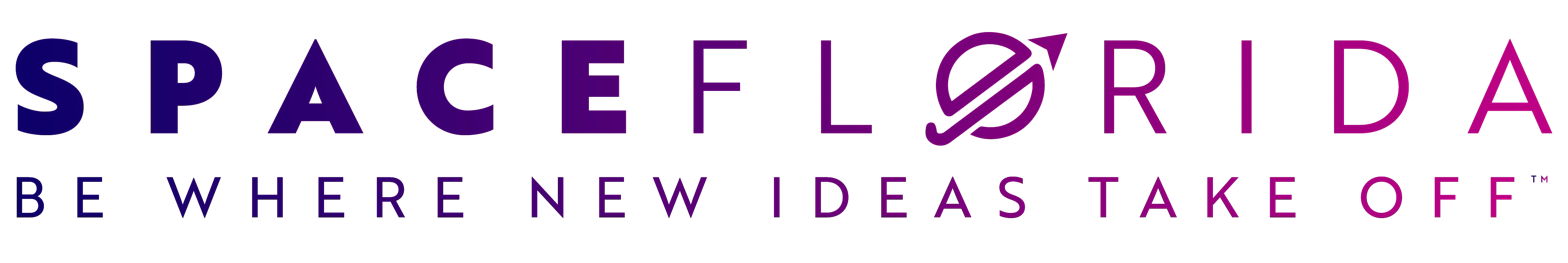

Agency overview
- Formed: 2006
- Type: Space agency
- Official language: English
- Primary spaceport: Cape Canaveral Spaceport
- Website: spaceflorida.gov

Space Florida is the aerospace finance, development, and spaceport authority for the State of Florida. Founded in 2006, with the vision for Florida to be the global and interplanetary hub for sustainable aerospace commerce. Space Florida works with aerospace companies, governmental agencies, financial and academic institutions to increase investment activity in Florida's aerospace ecosystem, maximize capacity and capability of Florida's spaceport system, and accelerate innovation.

== History ==
The agency was created by consolidating three existing state space entities into a single new organization via the Space Florida Act, enacted in May 2006 by the Florida Legislature. The predecessor entities were the Florida Space Authority, the Florida Space Research Institute and the Florida Aerospace Finance Corporation. In 2008, Aviation Week magazine reported that the U.S. Air Force committed to lease Cape Canaveral Launch Complex 36 to Space Florida for future use by the Athena III launch system, but that program had not moved forward as late as 2013.

In 2010, Space Florida became a "Preferred Partner" of the Google Lunar X PRIZE (GXLP), and, as such, had offered an additional US$2 million bonus to teams that might have launched their Google Lunar X PRIZE-winning missions from the state of Florida. In the event, the GXLP expired in 2018 before any team had even launched a rover mission to attempt to claim the prize.

== Florida Space Authority ==
Florida Space Authority logo

The Florida Space Authority (FSA) was created as a Florida state government space agency by Florida's Governor and legislature in 1989. The Authority's mission (as authorized in Chapter 331, Part Two, Florida Statutes) was to retain, expand and diversify the state's space-related industry. Chapter 331 gives FSA governmental powers similar to those of other types of transportation authorities (airport, seaport, etc.) to support and regulate the state's space transportation industry. It was empowered to own, operate, construct, finance, acquire, extend, equip and improve spaceport infrastructure. The Florida Space Authority served the state's Governor through the governor's Office of Tourism, Trade, and Economic Development. Development of the space industry. Chapter 331 of the Florida Statutes specifically states that the FSA is not to be considered an "agency," even though it receives funding directly from the state of Florida, according to its website.

With the Space Florida Act, enacted in May 2006, the Florida Legislature consolidated FSA, the Florida Space Research Institute, and the Florida Aerospace Finance Corporation to create Space Florida.

== ISS Research Competition ==
In 2012, Space Florida partnered with NanoRacks to host the Space Florida International Space Station (ISS) Research Competition. Participants competed to fly scientific research payloads in NanoLabs to the International Space Station. The experiments were then conducted on board the U.S. National Lab. Space Florida covered the costs of research payload transportation to the ISS for the eight winning applicants. The Space Florida ISS Research Competition is designed to inspire innovation and enable unique research opportunities and access for customers to the ISS.

== Earlier proposed spaceport ==
In the early 2010s, Space Florida proposed a commercial spaceport at Shiloh, in northern Brevard County, but those plans never came to fruition.

Located immediately north of the U.S. Government's Kennedy Space Center, the open access to the U.S. Air Force's Eastern Range over the open Atlantic Ocean to the east, and easy access to the range's tracking facilities made the location attractive on many margins. Among other potential users of the spaceport facility, SpaceX was reported to be considering Shiloh as one of several potential locations for building a commercial launch facility. Opponents of the proposed Shiloh launch location cite the potential for a negative impact on the natural environment because this area is home to several species listed as endangered or threatened. Even though the National Aeronautics and Space Administration (NASA) has yet to agree to turn over the land to the State of Florida for commercial development, NASA has agreed to let the Federal Aviation Administration lead an environmental impact study at the proposed site. SpaceX ended up selecting Brownsville, Texas to build its private spaceport.

On May 2, 2013, the Volusia County Council voted 6-1 in favor of a commercial launch site at Shiloh. Though largely symbolic in nature, the vote was considered by many to be a critical step toward any future development of the proposed Shiloh location.

In July 2014, after difficulties gaining support from environmental groups and others, Space Florida began looking for alternatives to the Shiloh location that would facilitate commercial space launch pads on the Florida Space Coast. These include working with the U.S. Air Force to see about converting some of the very large amount of unused military launch pads at Cape Canaveral Air Force Station (south of Shiloh) to state land that might be used as a commercial spaceport.

The efforts in late 2014 to find an alternative ultimately came to fruition in 2015 to open a Space Florida spaceport at a different location, with the September 2015 announcement that Blue Origin would manufacture their new orbital launch vehicle at Exploration Park, and launch the rocket from Launch Complex 36.

== Facilities with NASA ==
Space Florida has partnered with NASA on the following facilities:

- Exploration Park
- Shuttle Landing Facility

== See also ==
- California Space Authority
- New Mexico Spaceport Authority
- Oklahoma Space Industry Development Authority
- Virginia Commercial Space Flight Authority
