= Exploration Park =

Industrial park in Florida, US

Coordinates: 28.5134°N 80.6739°W

Exploration Park is a partnership formed in 2011 between NASA's Kennedy Space Center (KSC) and Space Florida. There are 299 acres on KSC property, but outside the NASA badge controlled area.

As of March 2016, companies have the opportunity to lease office or research facilities, or build their own facilities. The park is aimed at research and development, office, and light manufacturing commercial activities. The leased land and agreement with Space Florida is a part of the NASA's efforts to "grow and deploy commercial space capabilities."

- Space Life Sciences Lab is a major facility on site
- CASIS is located at KSC in the Space Life Sciences Lab (SLSL) which is a founding element (in 2011) of the Exploration Park initiative
- Blue Origin broke ground on a new rocket manufacturing facility in Exploration Park in June 2016.
- OneWeb is building a satellite manufacturing facility onsite.

The park is served by Florida State Road 321, named Space Commerce Way.
