= Florida Space Research Institute =

Statewide center for space research

The Florida Space Research Institute (FSRI) was a statewide center for space research which was established by Florida's governor and the Florida legislature in 1999. The institute was created in an effort to increase collaboration between the academic, government, and private organizations with regard to aerospace. FSRI is closely involved with NASA's Centennial Challenges program, and signed a cooperative agreement with Kennedy Space Center in order to collaborate on the Advanced Learning Environment (ALE) initiative in 2001. FSRI also co-sponsored the NASA Spaceport Engineering Design Student Competition 2003 (NASA Spaceport 2003) along with the Florida Space Grant Consortium (FSGC).

== Consolidation into Space Florida ==
With the Space Florida Act, enacted in May 2006, the Florida Legislature consolidated FSRI and two other organizations in order to create Space Florida
