= Kennedy Space Center =

NASA launch facility in Florida

John F. Kennedy Space Center

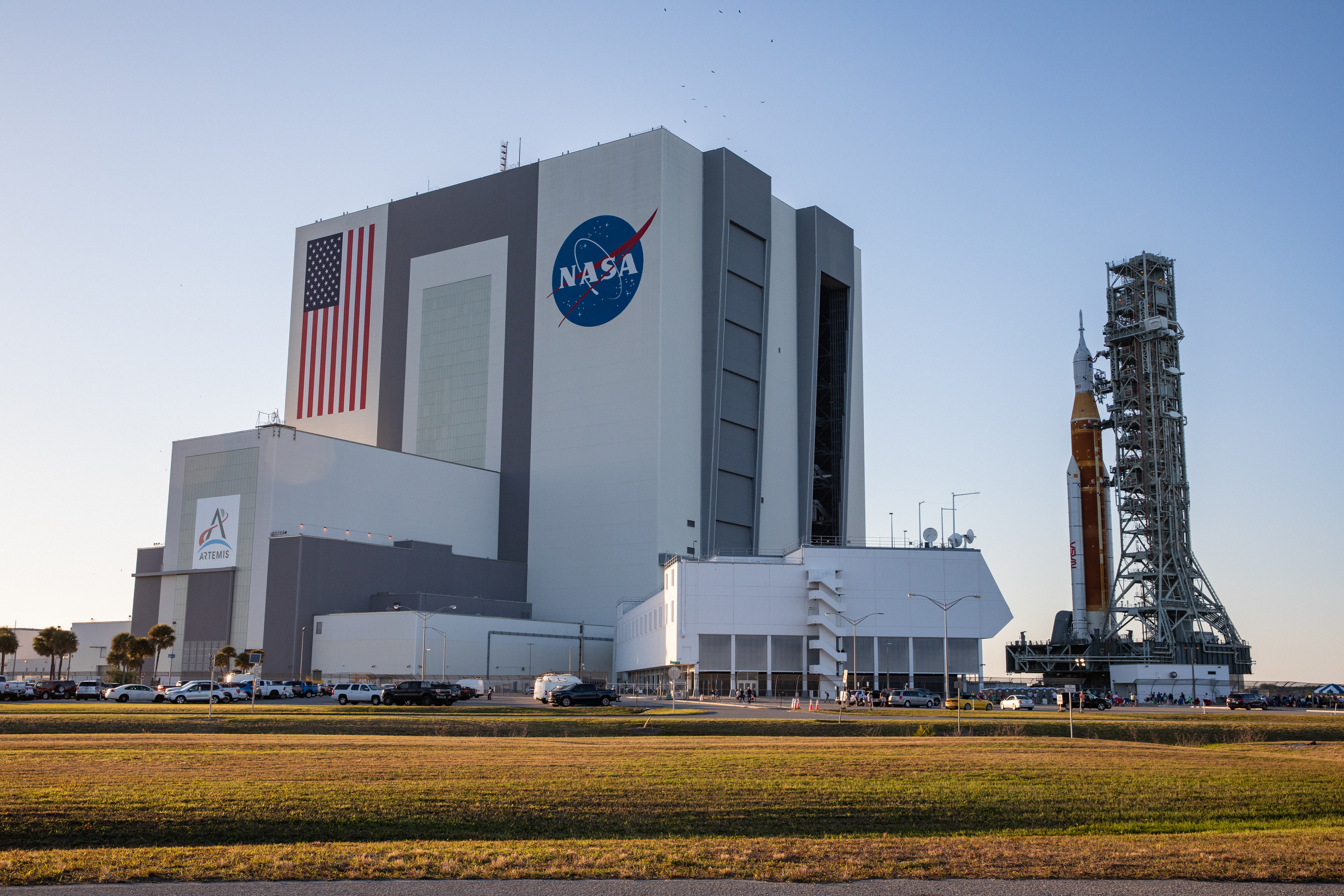
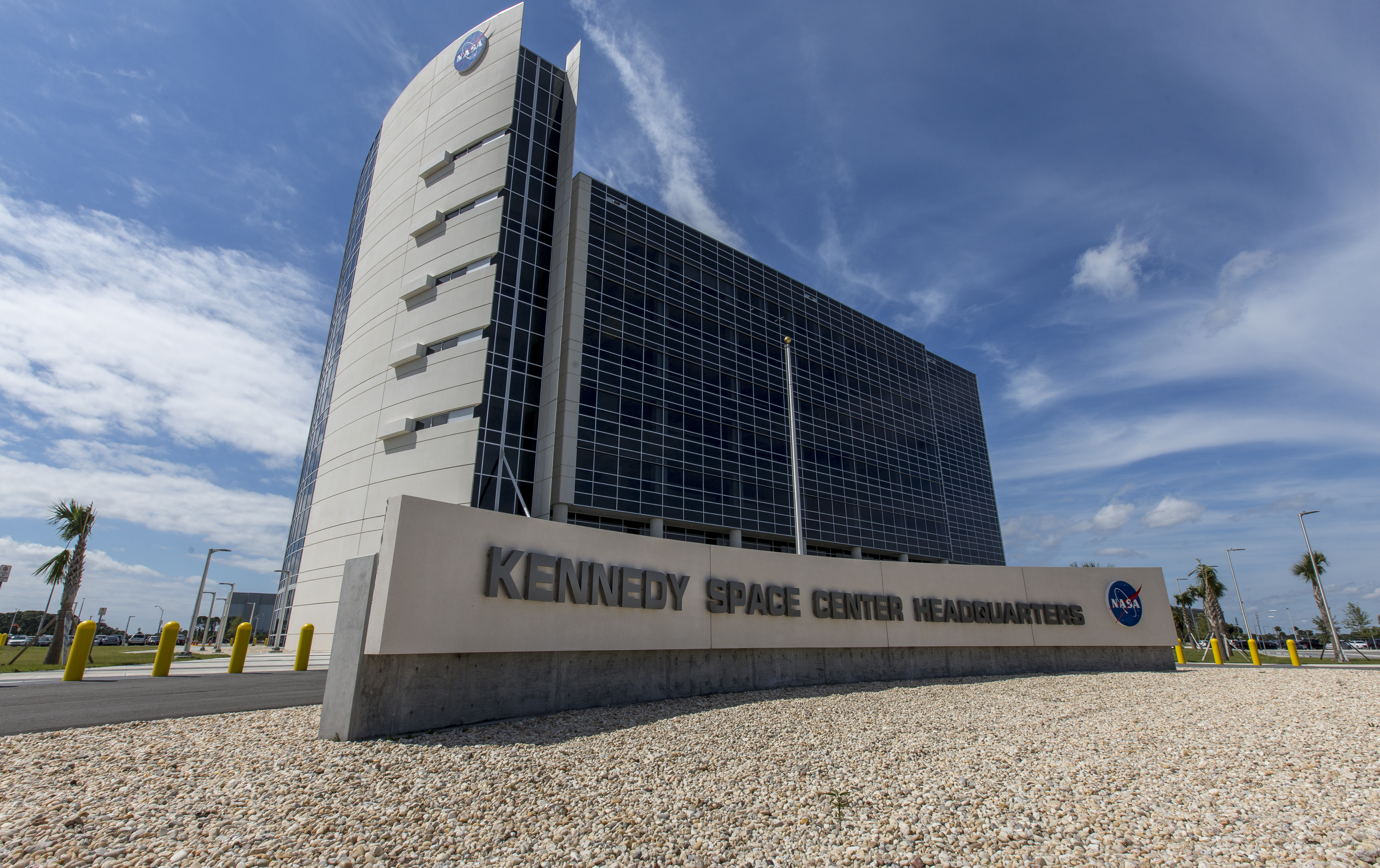
- Top: Vehicle Assembly Building; Bottom: Headquarters Building

Agency overview
- Formed: July 1, 1962; 64 years ago
- Jurisdiction: Federal government of the United States
- Headquarters: Merritt Island, Florida, United States; 28°31′29″N 80°38′55″W
- Employees: 17,701 civil servants and contractors (2025)
- Annual budget: US$2.646 billion (2025)
- Agency executive: Brian Hughes, director
- Parent agency: NASA
- Website: nasa.gov/kennedy

Map
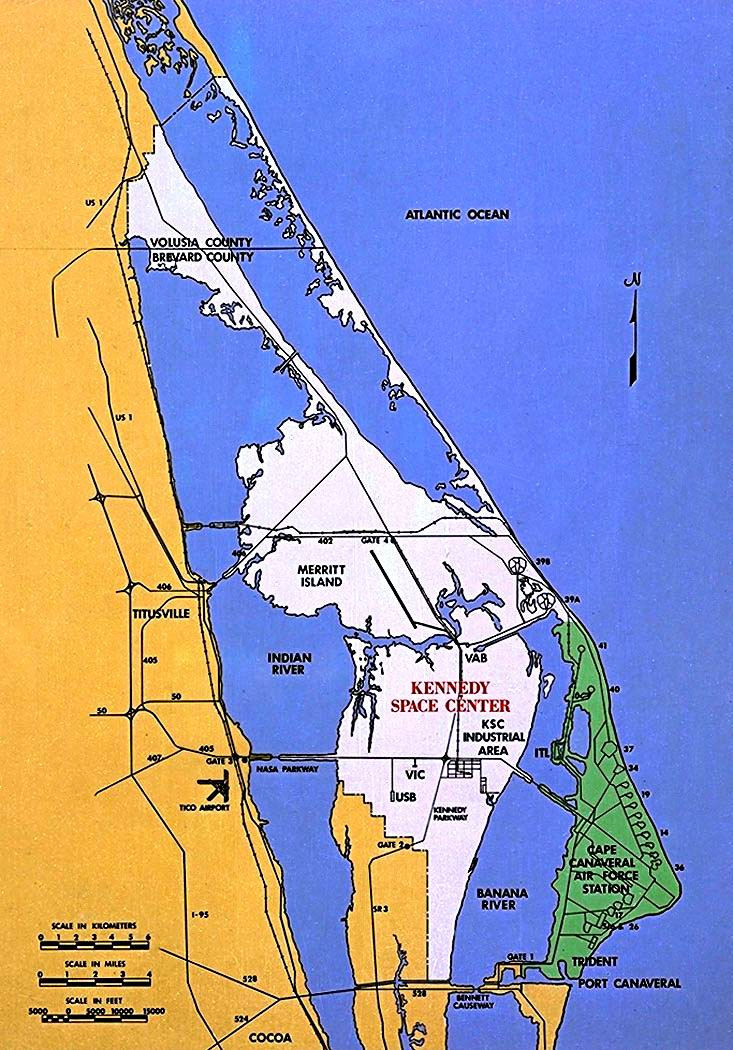
- KSC shown in white; Cape Canaveral Space Force Station in green

The John F. Kennedy Space Center (KSC, originally known as the NASA Launch Operations Center), located on Merritt Island, Florida, is one of the ten field centers of NASA. Since 1968, KSC has been NASA's primary launch center of American spaceflight, research, and technology. Launch operations for the Apollo, Skylab, Space Shuttle and Artemis programs were carried out from Kennedy Space Center Launch Complex 39 and managed by KSC. Located on the east coast of Florida, KSC is adjacent to Cape Canaveral Space Force Station (CCSFS). The management of the two entities work very closely together, share resources, and operate facilities on each other's property.

Though the first Apollo flights and all Project Mercury and Project Gemini flights took off from the then-Cape Canaveral Air Force Station, the launches were managed by KSC and its previous organization, the Launch Operations Directorate. Starting with the fourth Gemini mission, the NASA launch control center in Florida (Mercury Control Center, later the Launch Control Center) began handing off control of the vehicle to the Mission Control Center in Houston, shortly after liftoff; in prior missions it held control throughout the entire mission.

Additionally, the center manages launch of robotic and commercial crew missions and researches food production and in-situ resource utilization for off-Earth exploration. Since 2010, the center has worked to become a multi-user spaceport through industry partnerships.

There are about 700 facilities and buildings grouped throughout the center's 144,000 acres (580 km^{2}). Among the unique facilities at KSC are the 525-foot (160 m) tall Vehicle Assembly Building for stacking NASA's largest rockets, the Launch Control Center, which conducts space launches at KSC, the Operations and Checkout Building, which houses the astronauts' dormitories and suit-up area, a Space Station factory, and a 3-mile (4.8 km) long Shuttle Landing Facility. There is also a Visitor Complex on site that is open to the public.

== Formation ==
Since 1949, the military had been performing launch operations at what would become Cape Canaveral Space Force Station. In December 1959, the Department of Defense transferred 5,000 personnel and the Missile Firing Laboratory to NASA to become the Launch Operations Directorate under NASA's Marshall Space Flight Center.

President John F. Kennedy's 1961 goal of a crewed lunar landing by 1970 required an expansion of launch operations. On July 1, 1962, the Launch Operations Directorate was separated from MSFC to become the Launch Operations Center (LOC). Also, Cape Canaveral was inadequate to host the new launch facility design required for the mammoth 363-foot (111 m) tall, 7,500,000-pound-force (33,000 kN) thrust Saturn V rocket, which would be assembled vertically in a large hangar and transported on a mobile platform to one of several launch pads. Therefore, the decision was made to build a new LOC site located adjacent to Cape Canaveral on Merritt Island.

Facilities and geographic features of Kennedy Space Center
Facilities and geographical features of Kennedy Space Center:
1 Launch Complex 39 (LC-39A)
2 Launch Complex 39 (LC-39B)
3 Vehicle Assembly Building
4 Shuttle Landing Facility
5 Kennedy Space Center Visitor Complex
6 Apollo/Saturn V Center
7 Banana River
8 Indian River
9 KSC Headquarters Building
10 Astronaut Beach House
11 Banana Creek
12 Cochran Cove
13 Operations and Checkout Building
14 Launch Complex 48
15 SpaceX Roberts Road Operations Center
16 Exploration Park
17 Blue Origin Ransom Road facility
18 Crawlerway
19 Launch Control Center
20 Orbiter Processing Facilities 1 and 2
21 Orbiter Processing Facility 3
22 Launch Complex 39 Press Site
23 Multi-Payload Processing Facility
24 Space Systems Processing Facility
25 NASA Railroad (Wilson Junction)

In 1961, NASA formally announced its intent to acquire approximately 88,000 acres of land (about 138 square miles) along Florida's east coast, marking the beginning of what would become a much larger acquisition effort. NASA began land acquisition in 1962; in the years-long effort, NASA bought title to 131 square miles (340 km^{2}) and negotiated with the state of Florida for an additional 87 square miles (230 km^{2}). The U.S. Army Corps of Engineers oversaw the land acquisition process. They directly negotiated with property owners before resorting to condemnations when negotiations were inefficient. Much of the land NASA acquired was in agricultural use, particularly for citrus farming. In Merritt Island, citrus groves were purchased by mid-1963. Still, in an effort to manage the transition, NASA allowed many farmers to lease back their properties temporarily, allowing them to operate and reap harvest from the groves until summer 1964. To regulate activity in what was newly federally acquired land, all personnel required clearance to enter the controlled zone and special security badges were even issued to grove workers.

The major buildings in KSC's Industrial Area were designed by architect Charles Luckman. Construction began in November 1962, and Kennedy visited the site twice in 1962, and again just a week before his assassination on November 22, 1963.

On November 29, 1963, the facility was named by President Lyndon B. Johnson under Executive Order 11129. Johnson's order joined both the civilian LOC and the military Cape Canaveral station ("the facilities of Station No. 1 of the Atlantic Missile Range") under the designation "John F. Kennedy Space Center", spawning some confusion joining the two in the public mind. NASA administrator James E. Webb clarified this by issuing a directive stating the Kennedy Space Center name applied only to the LOC, while the Air Force issued a general order renaming the military launch site Cape Kennedy Air Force Station.

== Location ==
Located on Merritt Island, Florida, the center is north-northwest of Cape Canaveral on the Atlantic Ocean, midway between Miami and Jacksonville on Florida's Space Coast, due east of Orlando. It is 34 miles (55 km) long and roughly six miles (9.7 km) wide, covering 219 square miles (570 km^{2}). KSC is a major central Florida tourist destination and is approximately one hour's drive from the Orlando area. The Kennedy Space Center Visitor Complex offers public tours of the center and Cape Canaveral Space Force Station.

Before NASA's acquisition, the region consisted of a landscape that included swampland, citrus groves, and coastal beaches – features that are typical of Florida's undeveloped east coast. Parts of the land had to be dredged to support the construction of the Center's facilities. In addition to environmental transformation, the acquisition also led to the displacement of several small communities, including the towns of Shiloh and Allenhurst, which were completely enveloped by NASA. KSC's Environmental Management Branch has rescued over 100 mangrove seedlings during a living-shoreline restoration project, replanting them to stabilize the shoreline and reduce erosion while supporting local wildlife. KSC developed an "Indian River Lagoon Health Initiative Plan" in coordination with the Merritt Island National Wildlife Refuge and Canaveral National Seashore to monitor and restore ecological health through seagrass mapping, manatee and bird surveys, and shoreline resiliency projects. Within its 140,000-acre property, KSC includes a variety of habitats – such as coastal dunes, saltwater estuaries, marshes, pine flatwoods, and hardwood hammocks – which support more than 1,500 species of plants and animals, including dozens of federally or state‑listed species.

== Historical programs ==
=== Apollo program ===
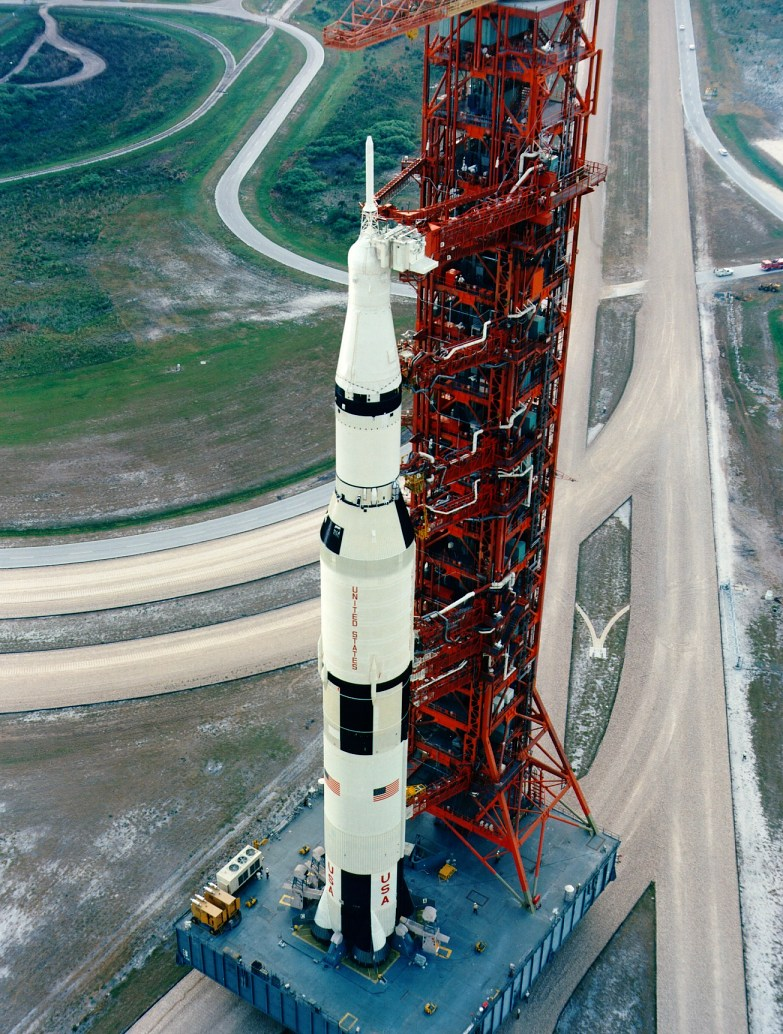
A Saturn V rocket carrying Apollo 15 rolls out to Pad 39A in 1971 on Mobile Launch Platform 1.

From 1967 through 1973, there were 13 Saturn V launches, including the ten remaining Apollo missions after Apollo 7. The first of two uncrewed flights, Apollo 4 (Apollo-Saturn 501) on November 9, 1967, was also the first rocket launch from KSC. The Saturn V's first crewed launch on December 21, 1968, was Apollo 8's lunar orbiting mission. The next two missions tested the Lunar Module: Apollo 9 (Earth orbit) and Apollo 10 (lunar orbit). Apollo 11, launched from Pad A on July 16, 1969, made the first Moon landing on July 20. The Apollo 11 launch included crewmembers Neil Armstrong, Michael Collins, and Buzz Aldrin, and attracted a record-breaking 650 million television viewers. Apollo 12 followed four months later. From 1970 to 1972, the Apollo program concluded at KSC with the launches of missions 13 through 17.

=== Skylab ===
On May 14, 1973, the last Saturn V launch put the Skylab space station in orbit from Pad 39A. By this time, the Cape Kennedy pads 34 and 37 used for the Saturn IB were decommissioned, so Pad 39B was modified to accommodate the Saturn IB, and used to launch three crewed missions to Skylab that year, as well as the final Apollo spacecraft for the Apollo–Soyuz Test Project in 1975.

=== Space Shuttle ===
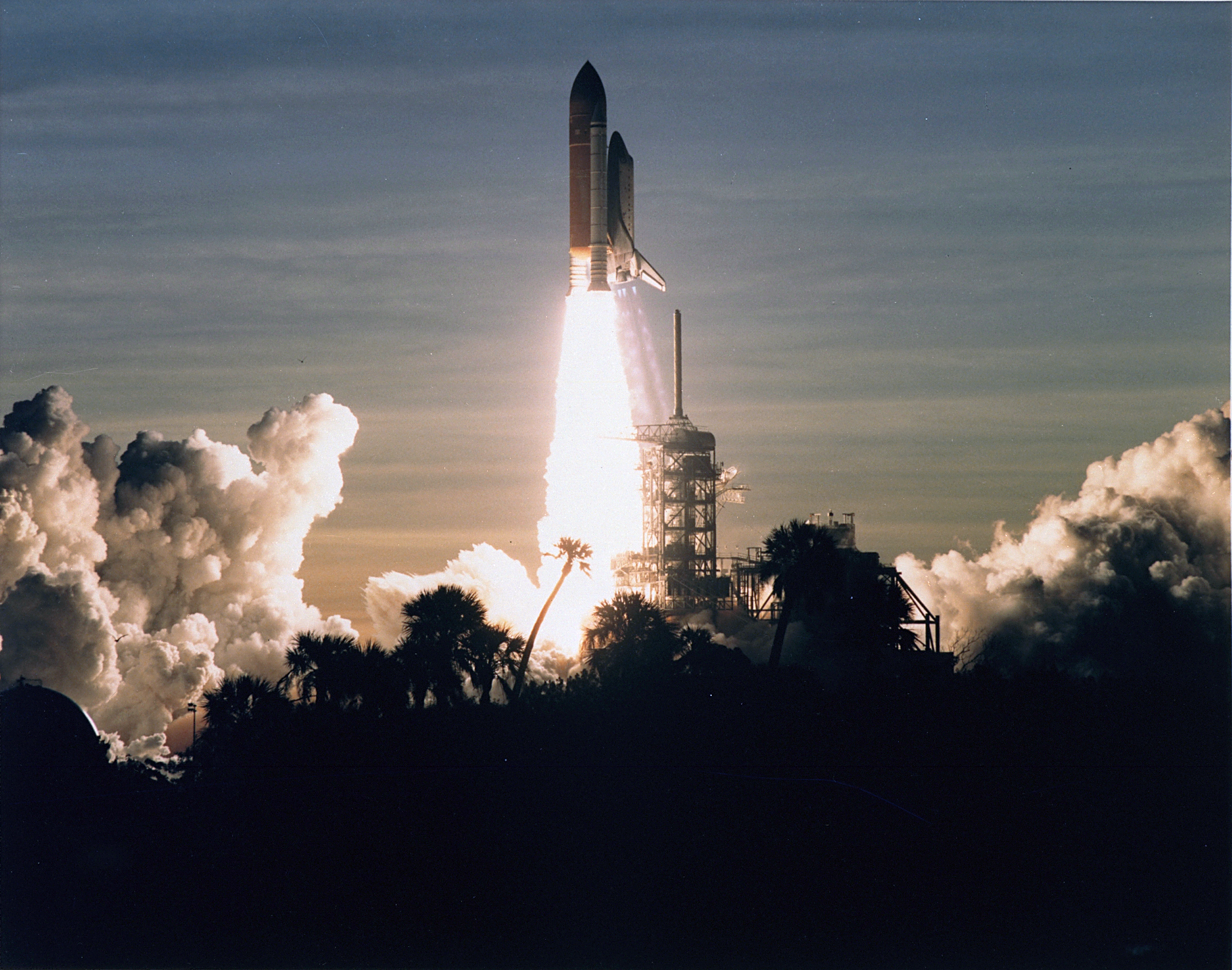
Shuttle Discovery launching from Pad 39A on STS-60, February 3, 1994

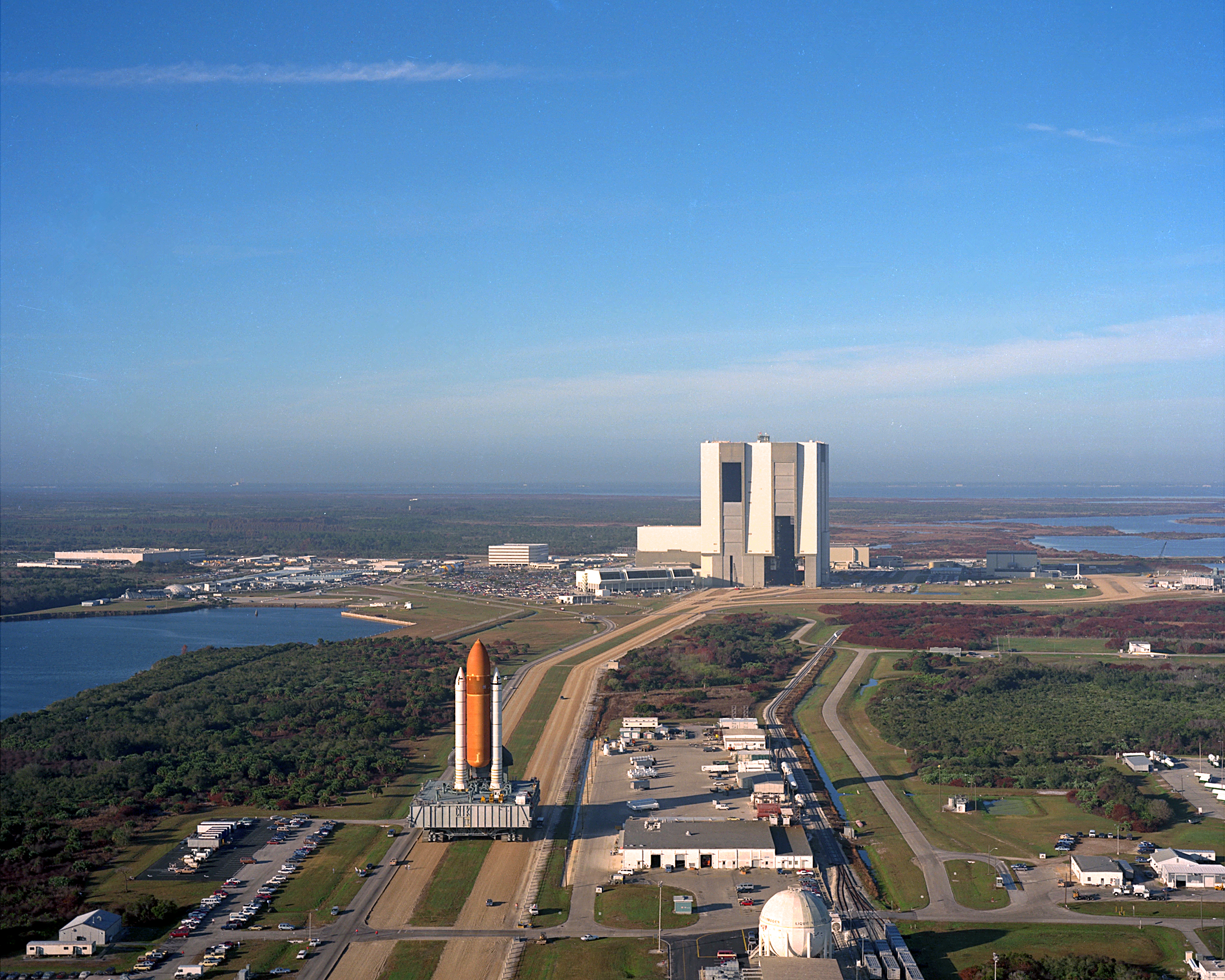
Shuttle Atlantis is moved to Pad 39A for the 1990 launch of STS-36.

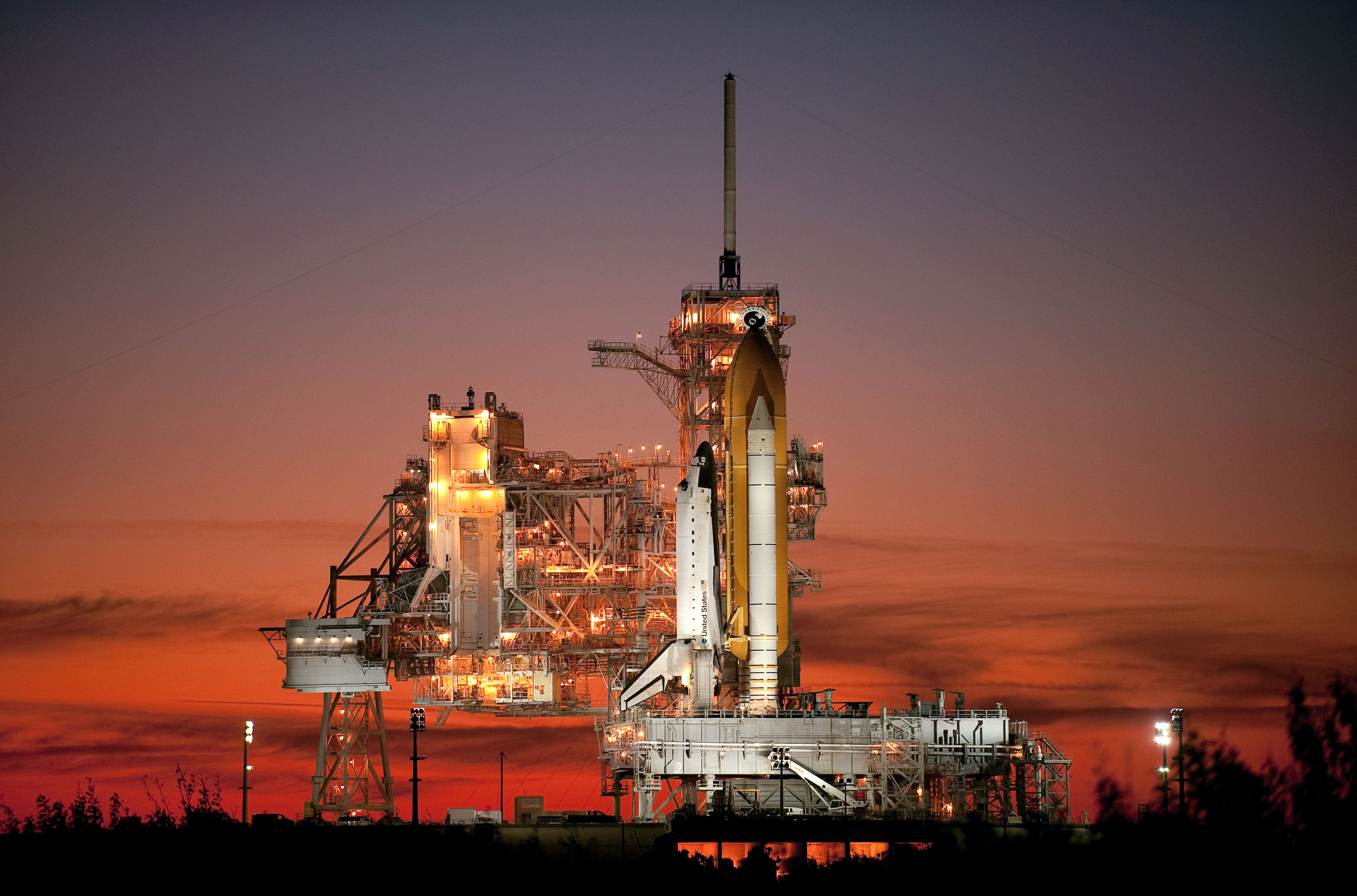
The Space Shuttle Atlantis (STS-129) is seen on launch pad 39A at the NASA Kennedy Space Center shortly after the rotating service structure was rolled back on November 15, 2009.

As the Space Shuttle was being designed, NASA received proposals for building alternative launch-and-landing sites at locations other than KSC, which demanded study. KSC had important advantages, including its existing facilities; location on the Intracoastal Waterway; and its southern latitude, which gives a velocity advantage to missions launched in easterly near-equatorial orbits. Disadvantages included: its inability to safely launch military missions into polar orbit, since spent boosters would be likely to fall on the Carolinas or Cuba; corrosion from the salt air; and frequent cloudy or stormy weather. Although building a new site at White Sands Missile Range in New Mexico was seriously considered, NASA announced its decision in April 1972 to use KSC for the shuttle. Since the Shuttle could not be landed automatically or by remote control, the launch of Columbia on April 12, 1981, for its first orbital mission STS-1, was NASA's first crewed launch of a vehicle that had not been tested in prior uncrewed launches.

In 1976, the VAB's south parking area was the site of Third Century America, a science and technology display commemorating the U.S. Bicentennial. Concurrent with this event, the U.S. flag was painted on the south side of the VAB. During the late 1970s, LC-39 was reconfigured to support the Space Shuttle. Two Orbiter Processing Facilities were built near the VAB as hangars with a third added in the 1980s.

KSC's 2.9-mile (4.7 km) Shuttle Landing Facility (SLF) was the orbiters' primary end-of-mission landing site, although the first KSC landing did not take place until the tenth flight, when Challenger completed STS-41-B on February 11, 1984; the primary landing site until then was Edwards Air Force Base in California, subsequently used as a backup landing site. The SLF also provided a return-to-launch-site (RTLS) abort option, which was not used. The SLF is among the longest runways in the world.

=== Expendable launch vehicles (ELVs) ===
Beginning in 1958, NASA and military worked side by side on robotic mission launches (previously referred to as unmanned), cooperating as they broke ground in the field. In the early 1960s, NASA had as many as two robotic mission launches a month. The frequent number of flights allowed for quick evolution of the vehicles, as engineers gathered data, learned from anomalies and implemented upgrades. In 1963, with the intent of KSC ELV work focusing on the ground support equipment and facilities, a separate Atlas/Centaur organization was formed under NASA's Lewis Center (now Glenn Research Center (GRC)), taking that responsibility from the Launch Operations Center (aka KSC).

Though almost all robotics missions launched from the Cape Canaveral Space Force Station (CCSFS), KSC "oversaw the final assembly and testing of rockets as they arrived at the Cape." In 1965, KSC's Unmanned Launch Operations directorate became responsible for all NASA uncrewed launch operations, including those at Vandenberg Space Force Base. From the 1950s to 1978, KSC chose the rocket and payload processing facilities for all robotic missions launching in the U.S., overseeing their near launch processing and checkout. In addition to government missions, KSC performed this service for commercial and foreign missions also, though non-U.S. government entities provided reimbursement. NASA also funded Cape Canaveral Space Force Station launch pad maintenance and launch vehicle improvements.

All this changed with the Commercial Space Launch Act of 1984, after which NASA only coordinated its own and National Oceanic and Atmospheric Administration (NOAA) ELV launches. Companies were able to "operate their own launch vehicles" and use NASA's launch facilities. Payload processing handled by private firms also started to occur outside KSC. Reagan's 1988 space policy furthered the movement of this work from KSC to commercial companies. That same year, launch complexes on Cape Canaveral Air Force Station started transferring from NASA to Air Force Space Command management.

In the 1990s, though KSC was not performing the hands-on ELV work, engineers still maintained an understanding of ELVs and had contracts allowing them insight into the vehicles so they could provide knowledgeable oversight. KSC also worked on ELV research and analysis and the contractors were able to use KSC personnel as a resource for technical issues. KSC, with the payload and launch vehicle industries, developed advances in automation of the ELV launch and ground operations to enable competitiveness of U.S. rockets against the global market.

In 1998, the Launch Services Program (LSP) formed at KSC, pulling together programs (and personnel) that already existed at KSC, GRC, Goddard Space Flight Center, and more to manage the launch of NASA and NOAA robotic missions. Cape Canaveral Space Force Station and VAFB are the primary launch sites for LSP missions, though other sites are occasionally used. LSP payloads such as the Mars Science Laboratory have been processed at KSC before being transferred to a launch pad on Cape Canaveral Space Force Station.

=== Artemis program ===
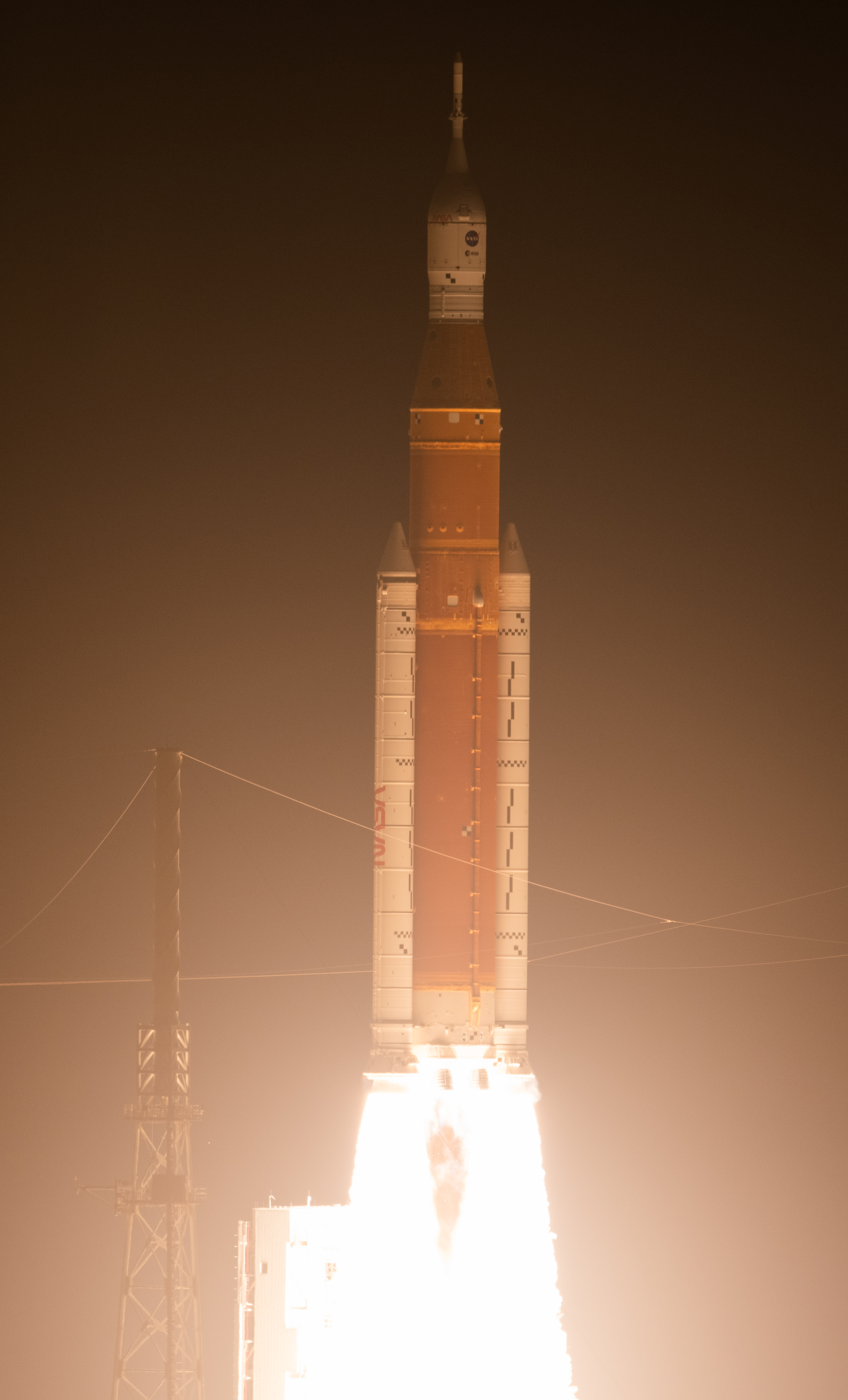
Artemis I launch

On November 16, 2022, at 06:47:44 UTC the Space Launch System (SLS) was launched from Complex 39B as part of the Artemis I mission. On April 1, 2026, at 6:35:12 EDT the SLS was launched from the same location as part of the Artemis II mission.

=== Space station processing ===
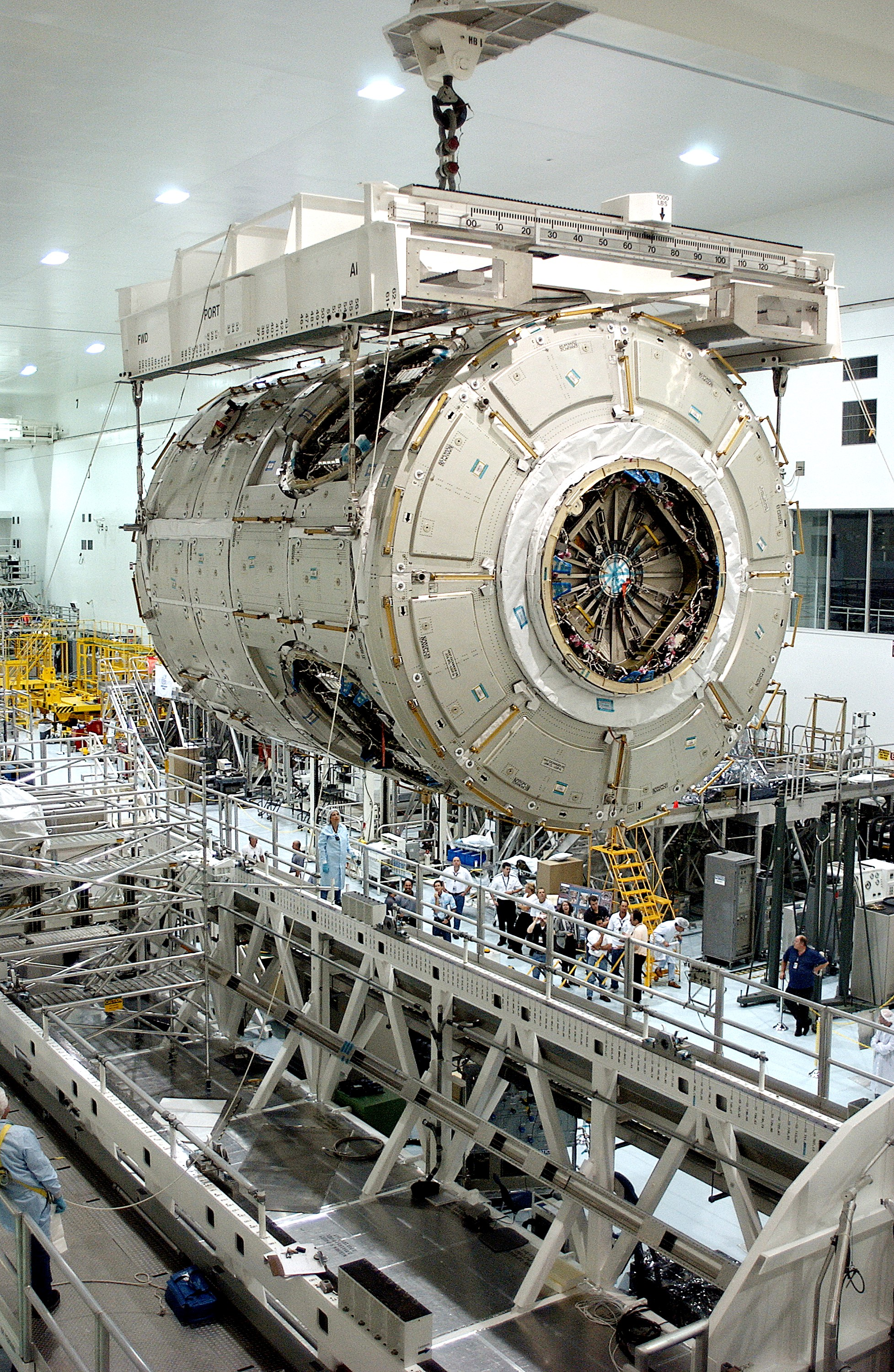
Node 2 being hoisted by overhead cranes in the Space Station Processing Facility

As the International Space Station modules design began in the early 1990s, KSC began to work with other NASA centers and international partners to prepare for processing before launch onboard the Space Shuttles. KSC used its hands-on experience processing the 22 Spacelab missions in the Operations and Checkout Building to gather expectations of ISS processing. These experiences were incorporated into the design of the Space Station Processing Facility (SSPF), which began construction in 1991. The Space Station Directorate formed in 1996. KSC personnel were embedded at station module factories for insight into their processes.

From 1997 to 2007, KSC planned and performed on the ground integration tests and checkouts of station modules: three Multi-Element Integration Testing (MEIT) sessions and the Integration Systems Test (IST). Numerous issues were found and corrected that would have been difficult to nearly impossible to do on-orbit.

In January 2025, NASA's Kennedy Space Center signed a memorandum of understanding with the University of Florida, University of Central Florida, and Embry‑Riddle Aeronautical University to form the Florida University Space Research Consortium, advancing Moon-to-Mars research. A Systems Engineering & Integration (SE&I) bootcamp, backed by a three-year grant, was launched at KSC in 2025 by FAMU‑FSU College of Engineering in partnership with NASA to train 30 professionals in systems engineering for the Artemis campaign.

The second "SpaceU Symposium" was held in November 2025 at UCF, involving KSC researchers, university students, and space industry leaders to showcase innovation, research, and job opportunities in partnership with NASA.

The Florida University Space Research Consortium is part of a broader Florida Space Grant program that includes dozens of universities, which provides research funding and strong ties between KSC and higher education institutions to support NASA's missions.

Today KSC continues to process ISS payloads from across the world before launch along with developing its experiments for on orbit. The proposed Lunar Gateway would be manufactured and processed at the Space Station Processing Facility.

== Current programs and initiatives ==
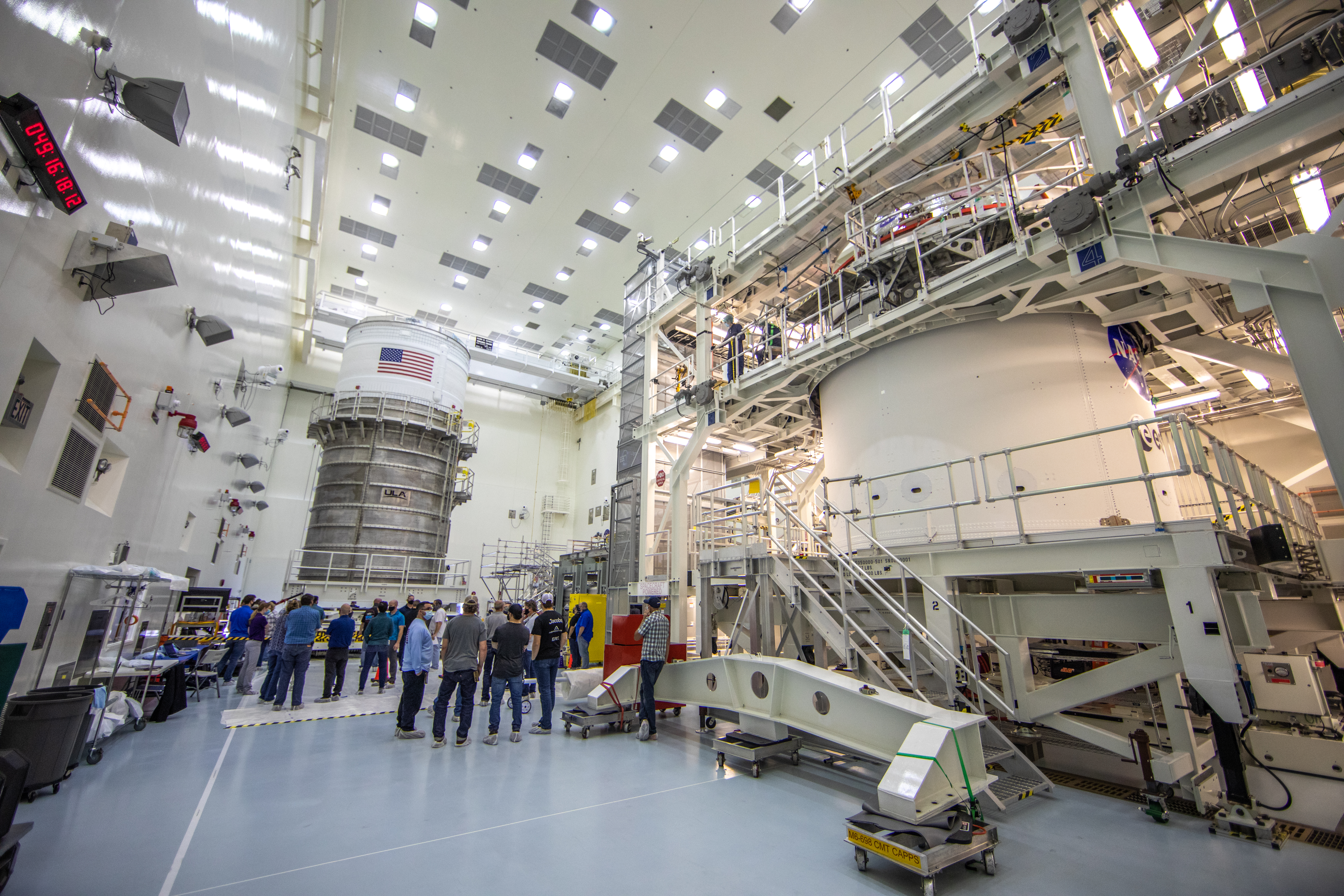
Artemis I ICPS at Kennedy Space Center

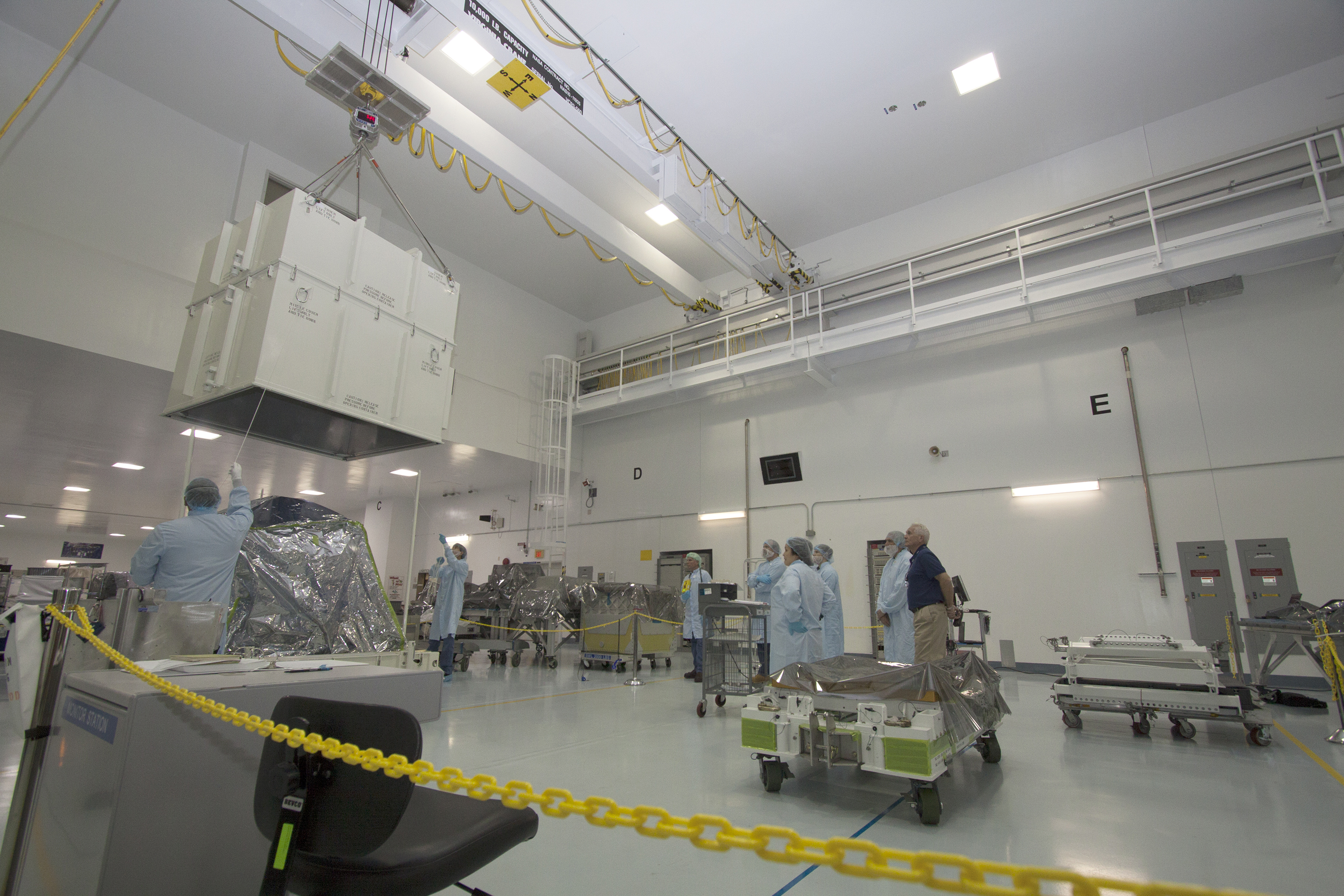
SAGE III at Space Station Processing Facility

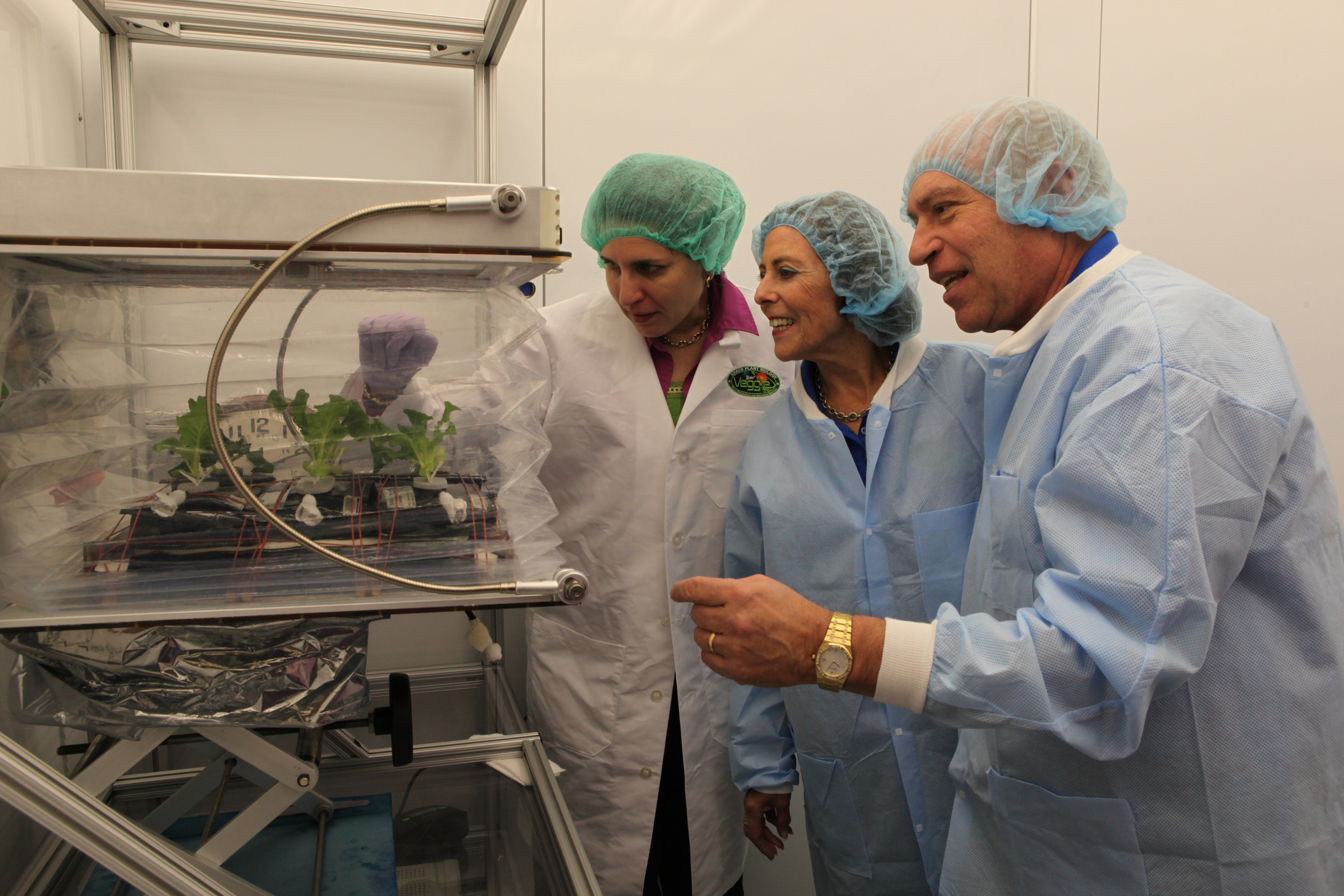
NASA scientist, observe ground control experiments in the Veggie Lab at NASA's Kennedy Space Center

The following are current programs and initiatives at Kennedy Space Center:

- Commercial Crew Program
- Exploration Ground Systems Program
- Launch Services Program
- Educational Launch of Nanosatellites (ELaNa)
- Research and Technology
- Artemis program
- Lunar Gateway
- International Space Station Payloads
- Camp KSC: educational camps for schoolchildren in spring and summer, with a focus on space, aviation and robotics.

== Facilities ==
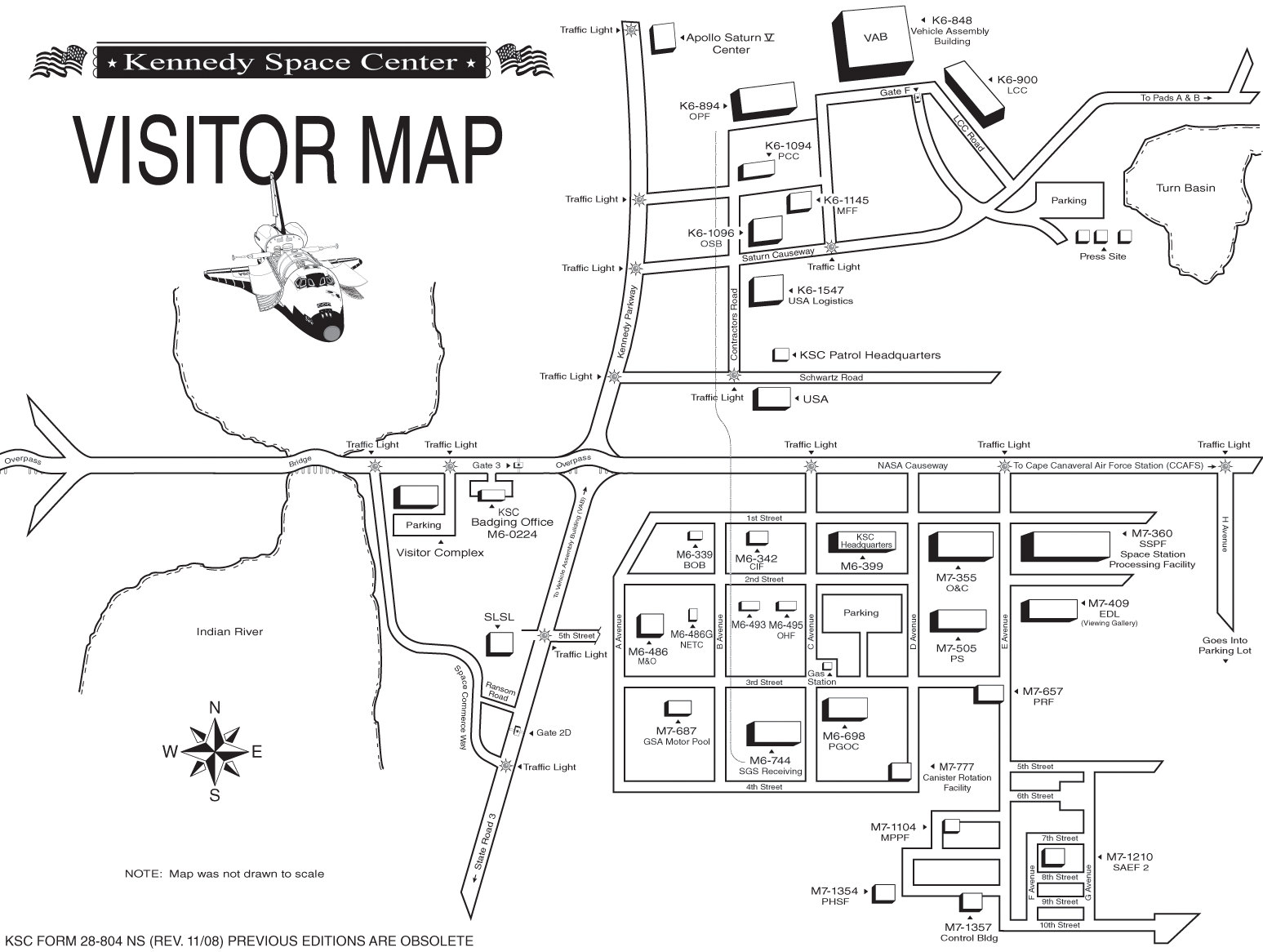
KSC industrial area

The KSC Industrial Area, where many of the center's support facilities are located, is 5 miles (8 km) south of LC-39. It includes the Headquarters Building, the Operations and Checkout Building and the Central Instrumentation Facility. The astronaut crew quarters are in the O&C; before it was completed, the astronaut crew quarters were located in Hangar S at the Cape Canaveral Missile Test Annex (now Cape Canaveral Space Force Station). Located at KSC was the Merritt Island Spaceflight Tracking and Data Network station (MILA), a key radio communications and spacecraft tracking complex.

Facilities at the Kennedy Space Center are directly related to its mission to launch and recover missions. Facilities are available to prepare and maintain spacecraft and payloads for flight. The Headquarters (HQ) Building houses offices for the Center Director, library, film and photo archives, a print shop and security. When the KSC Library first opened, it was part of the Army Ballistic Missile Agency. However, in 1965, the library moved into three separate sections in the newly opened NASA headquarters before eventually becoming a single unit in 1970. The library contains over four million items related to the history and the work at Kennedy. As one of ten NASA center libraries in the country, their collection focuses on engineering, science, and technology. The archives contain planning documents, film reels, and original photographs covering the history of KSC. The library is not open to the public but is available for KSC, Space Force, and Navy employees who work on site.

A new Headquarters Building was completed in 2019 as part of the Central Campus consolidation. Groundbreaking began in 2014.

The center operated its own 17-mile (27 km) short-line railroad. This operation was discontinued in 2015, with the sale of its final two locomotives. A third had already been donated to a museum. The line was costing $1.3 million annually to maintain.

=== Payload manufacture and processing ===
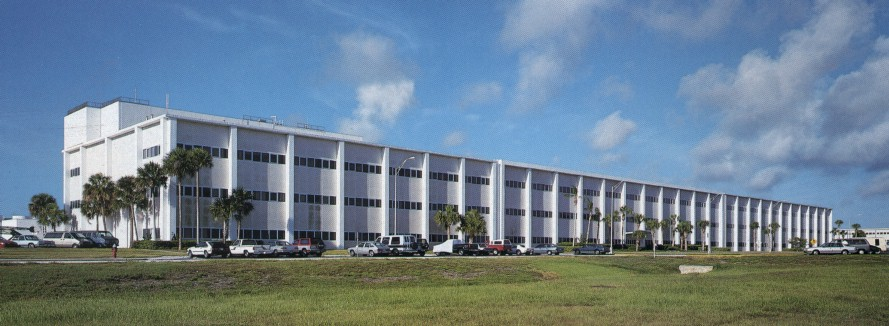
Neil Armstrong Operations and Checkout Building

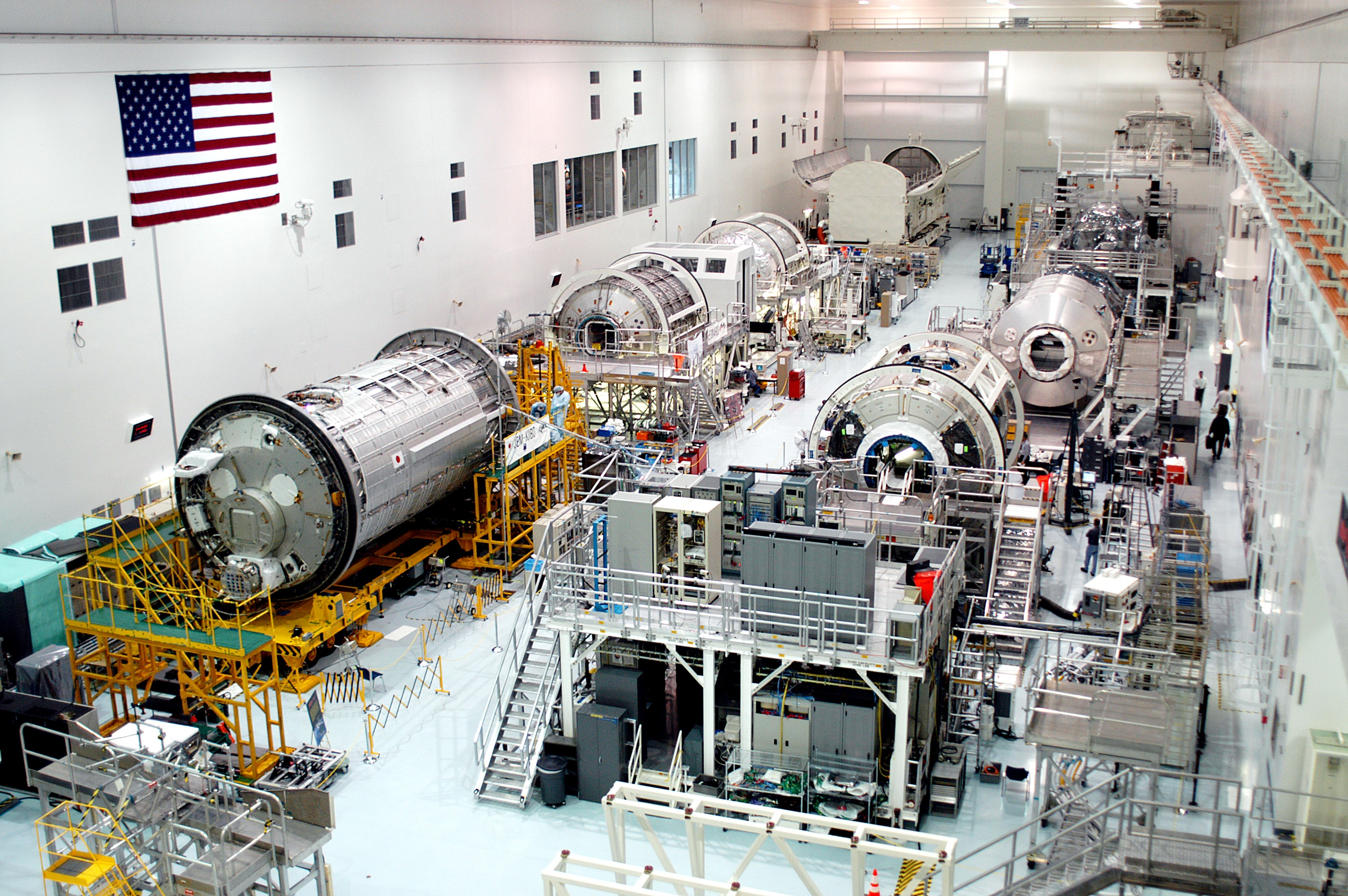
Pre-made ISS modules in the Space Station Processing Facility

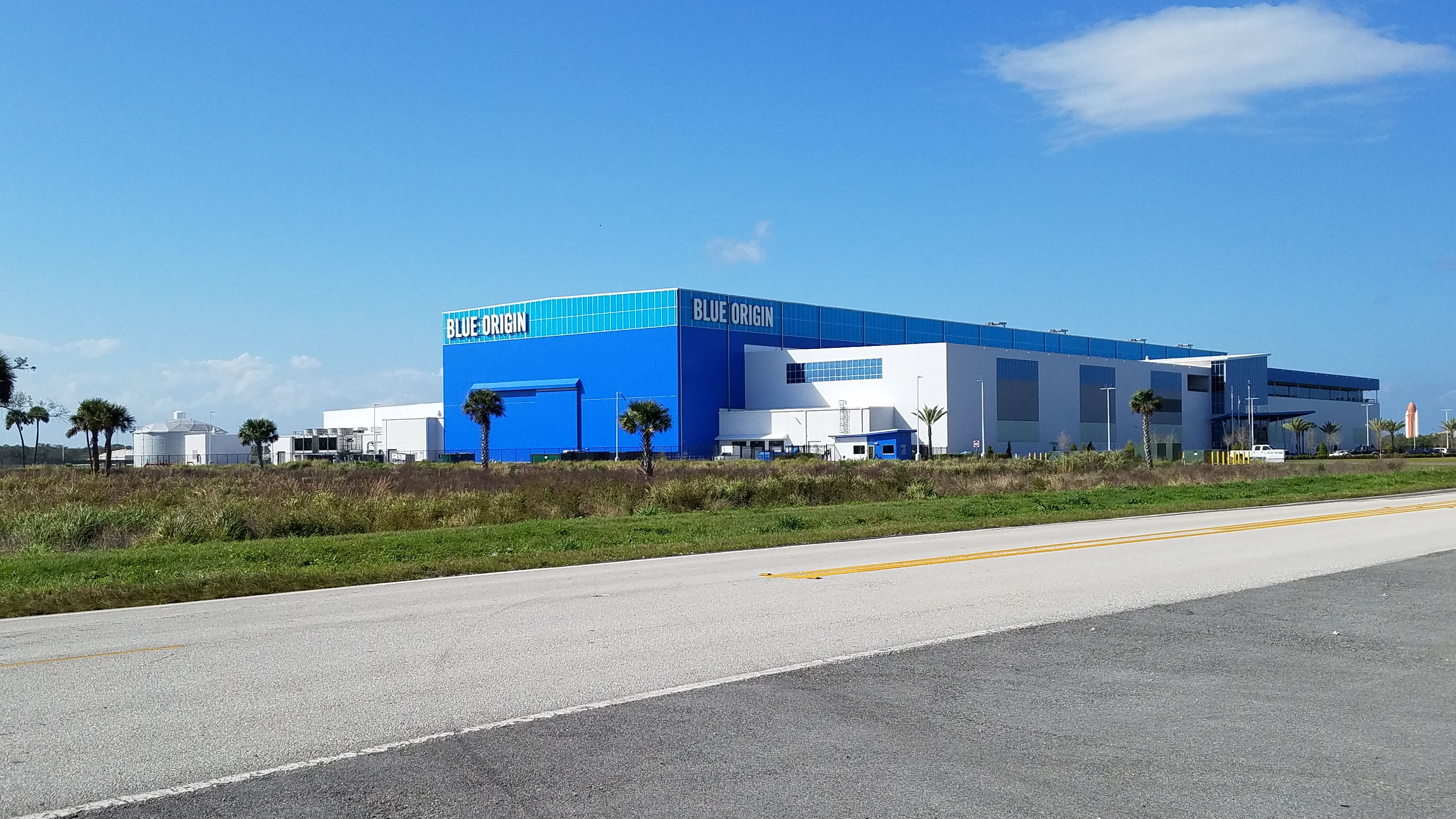
Blue Origin's manufacturing facility near KSC visitor complex

- The Neil Armstrong Operations and Checkout Building (O&C) (previously known as the Manned Spacecraft Operations Building) is a historic site on the U.S. National Register of Historic Places dating back to the 1960s and was used to receive, process, and integrate payloads for the Gemini and Apollo programs, the Skylab program in the 1970s, and for initial segments of the International Space Station through the 1990s. The Apollo and Space Shuttle astronauts would board the astronaut transfer van to launch complex 39 from the O&C building.
- The three-story, 457,000-square-foot (42,500 m^{2}) Space Systems Processing Facility (SSPF) consists of two enormous processing bays, an airlock, operational control rooms, laboratories, logistics areas and office space for support of non-hazardous Space Station and Shuttle payloads to ISO 14644-1 class 5 standards. Opened in 1994, it is the largest building in the KSC industrial area.
- The Multi-Payload Processing Facility is a 19,647 square feet (1,825.3 m^{2}) building used for Orion spacecraft and payload processing.
- The Payload Hazardous Servicing Facility (PHSF) contains a 70-by-110-foot (21 by 34 m) service bay, with a 100,000-pound (45,000 kg), 85-foot (26 m) hook height. It also contains a 58-by-80-foot (18 by 24 m) payload airlock. Its temperature is maintained at 70 °F (21 °C).

=== Launch Complex 39 ===
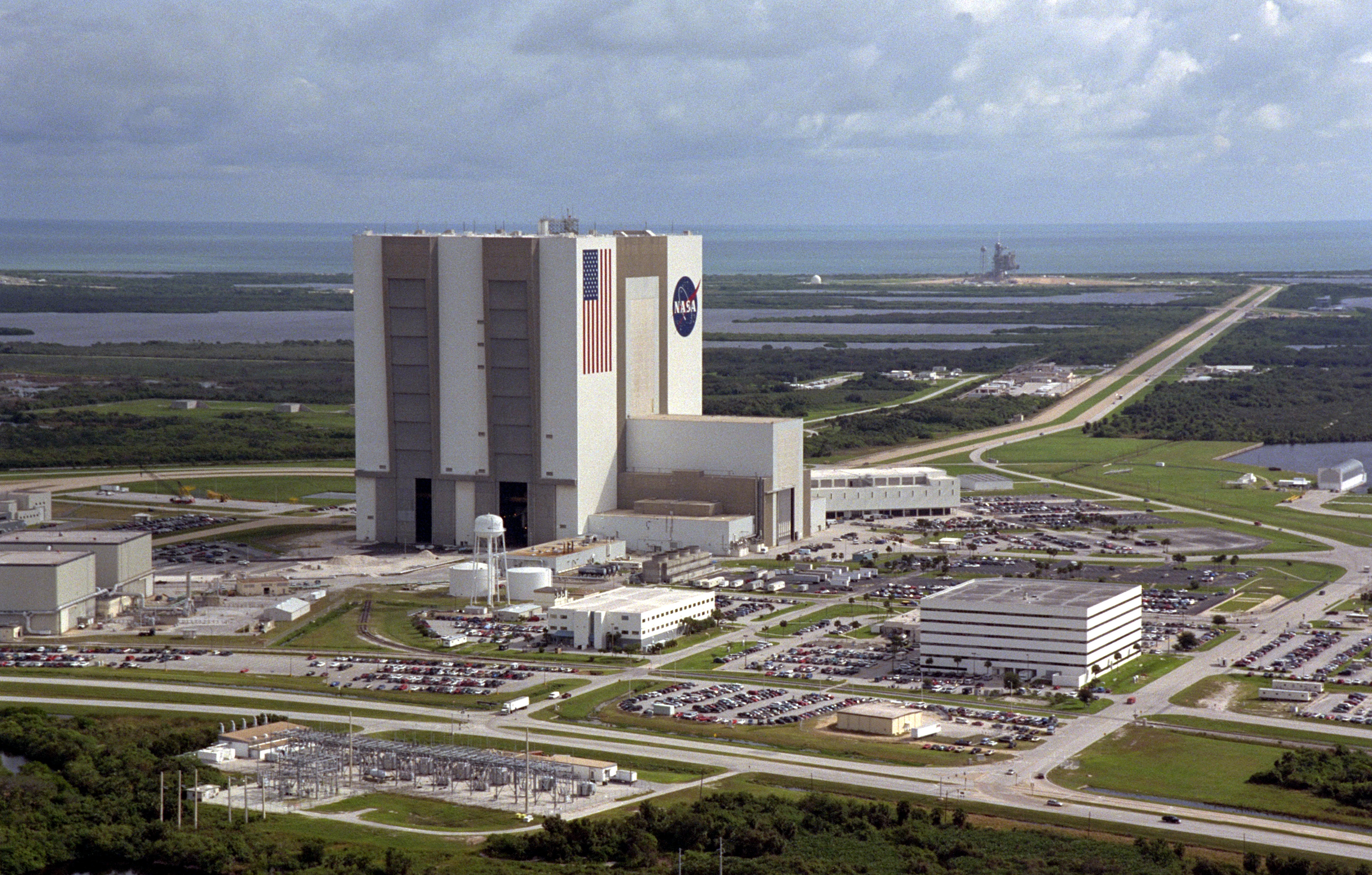
The Vehicle Assembly Building (center) in 1999, with the Launch Control Center jutting out from its right, and Pads A and B in the distance

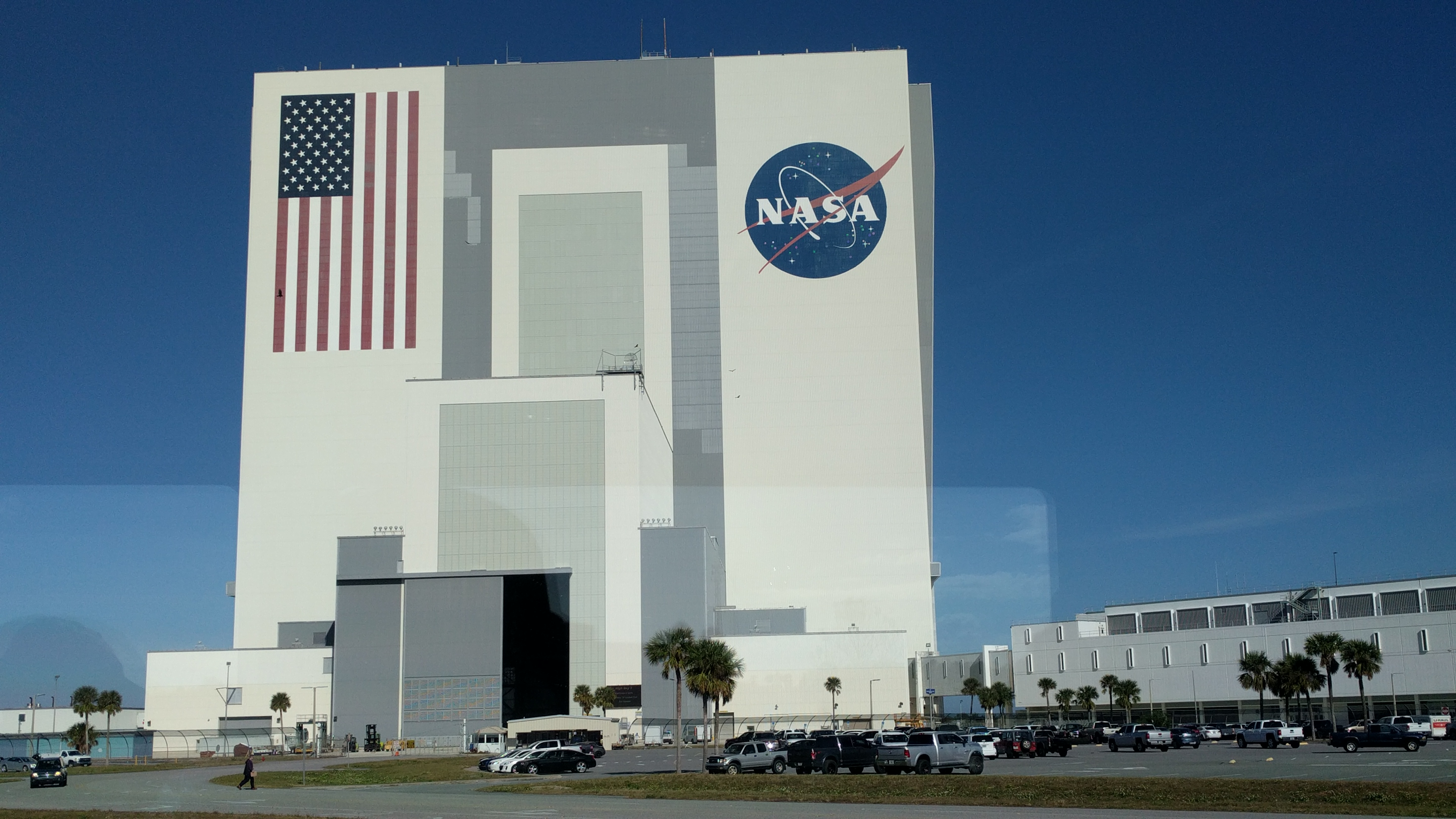
Closeup photo of the VAB

Launch Complex 39 (LC-39) was originally built for the Saturn V, the largest and most powerful operational launch vehicle until the Space Launch System, for the Apollo crewed Moon landing program. Since the end of the Apollo program in 1972, LC-39 has been used to launch every NASA human space flight, including Skylab (1973), the Apollo–Soyuz Test Project (1975), and the Space Shuttle program (1981–2011).

Since December 1968, all launch operations have been conducted from launch pads A and B at LC-39. Both pads are on the ocean, 3 miles (4.8 km) east of the VAB. From 1969 to 1972, LC-39 was the "Moonport" for all six Apollo crewed Moon landing missions using the Saturn V, and was used from 1981 to 2011 for all Space Shuttle launches.

Human missions to the Moon required the large three-stage Saturn V rocket, which was 363 feet (111 meters) tall and 33 feet (10 meters) in diameter. At KSC, Launch Complex 39 was built on Merritt Island to accommodate the new rocket. Construction of the $800 million project began in November 1962. LC-39 pads A and B were completed by October 1965 (planned Pads C, D and E were canceled), the VAB was completed in June 1965, and the infrastructure by late 1966.

An economic impact report indicates that companies like SpaceX and Blue Origin are developing campus-like facilities at KSC's Launch Complex 39A and Exploration Park, fostering integrated manufacturing, testing, and launch operations on-site.

The complex includes:

- the Vehicle Assembly Building (VAB), a 130,000,000 cubic feet (3,700,000 m^{3}) hangar capable of holding four Saturn Vs. The VAB was the largest structure in the world by volume when completed in 1965.
- a transporter capable of carrying 5,440 tons along a crawlerway to either of two launch pads;
- a 446-foot (136 m) mobile service structure, with three Mobile Launcher Platforms, each containing a fixed launch umbilical tower;
- the Launch Control Center; and
- a news media facility.

=== Launch Complex 48 ===
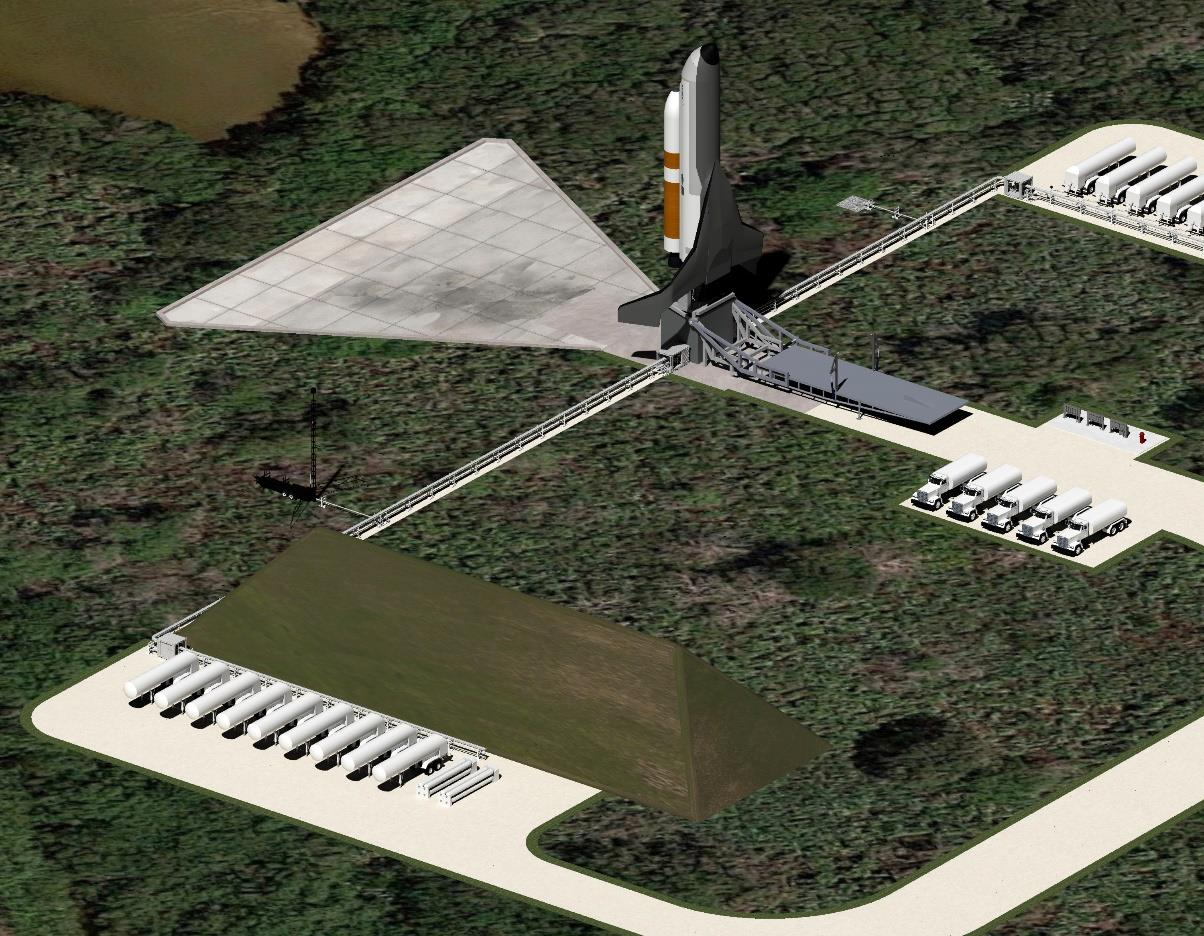
A rendering of Boeing's XS-1 Phantom Express launch vehicle on LC-48

Launch Complex 48 (LC-48) is a planned multi-user launch site for small launchers and spacecraft. It will be located between Launch Complex 39A and Space Launch Complex 41, with LC-39A to the north and SLC-41 to the south. LC-48 will be constructed as a "clean pad" to support multiple launch systems with differing propellant needs. While initially only planned to have a single pad, the complex is capable of being expanded to two at a later date.

=== Commercial leasing ===
As a part of promoting commercial space industry growth in the area and the overall center as a multi-user spaceport, KSC leases some of its properties. Here are some major examples:

- Exploration Park to multiple users (partnership with Space Florida)
- Shuttle Landing Facility to Space Florida (who contracts use to private companies)
- Orbiter Processing Facility (OPF)-3 to Boeing (for CST-100 Starliner)
- Launch Complex 39A, Launch Control Center Firing Room 4 and land for SpaceX's Roberts Road facility (Hangar X) to SpaceX
- O&C High Bay to Lockheed Martin (for Orion processing)
- Land for FPL's Space Coast Next Generation Solar Energy Center to Florida Power and Light (FPL)
- Hypergolic Maintenance Facility (HMF) to United Paradyne Corporation (UPC)

=== Visitor complex ===
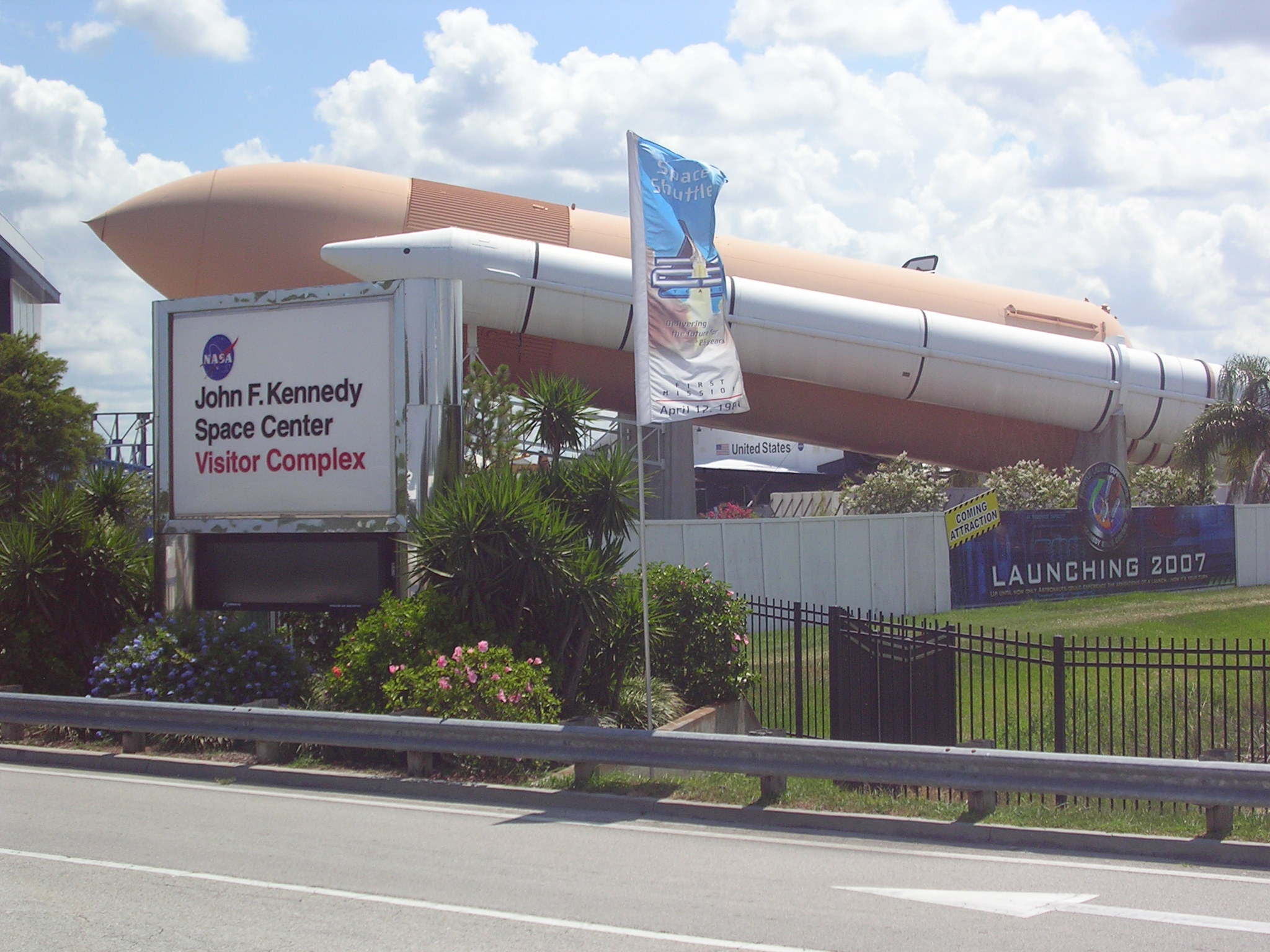
Gate to the KSC Visitor Complex in 2006; Explorer, a Space Shuttle mock-up, is in the background

The Kennedy Space Center Visitor Complex, operated by Delaware North since 1995, has a variety of exhibits, artifacts, displays and attractions on the history and future of human and robotic spaceflight. Bus tours of KSC originate from here. The complex also includes the separate Apollo/Saturn V Center, north of the VAB and the United States Astronaut Hall of Fame, six miles west near Titusville. There were 1.5 million visitors in 2009. It had some 700 employees.

It was announced on May 29, 2015, that the Astronaut Hall of Fame exhibit would be moved from its current location to another location within the Visitor Complex to make room for an upcoming high-tech attraction entitled "Heroes and Legends". The attraction, designed by Orlando-based design firm Falcon's Treehouse, opened November 11, 2016.

In March 2016, the visitor center unveiled the new location of the iconic countdown clock at the complex's entrance; previously, the clock was located with a flagpole at the press site. The clock was originally built and installed in 1969 and listed with the flagpole in the National Register of Historic Places in January 2000. In 2019, NASA celebrated the 50th anniversary of the Apollo program, and the launch of Apollo 10 on May 18. In summer of 2019, Lunar Module 9 (LM-9) was relocated to the Apollo/Saturn V Center as part of an initiative to rededicate the center and celebrate the 50th anniversary of the Apollo Program.

=== Historic locations ===
NASA lists the following Historic Districts at KSC; each district has multiple associated facilities:

- Launch Complex 39: Pad A Historic District
- Launch Complex 39: Pad B Historic District
- Shuttle Landing Facility (SLF) Area Historic District
- Orbiter Processing Historic District
- Solid Rocket Booster (SRB) Disassembly and Refurbishment Complex Historic District
- NASA KSC Railroad System Historic District
- NASA-owned Cape Canaveral Space Force Station Industrial Area Historic District

There are 24 historic properties outside these historic districts, including the Space Shuttle Atlantis, Vehicle Assembly Building, Crawlerway, and Operations and Checkout Building. KSC has one National Historic Landmark, 78 National Register of Historic Places (NRHP) listed or eligible sites, and 100 Archaeological Sites.

=== Other facilities ===
- The Rotation, Processing and Surge Facility (RPSF) is responsible for the preparation of solid rocket booster segments for transportation to the Vehicle Assembly Building (VAB). The RPSF was built in 1984 to perform SRB operations that had previously been conducted in high bays 2 and 4 of the VAB at the beginning of the Space Shuttle program. It was used until the Space Shuttle's retirement, and will be used in the future by the Space Launch System (SLS) and OmegA rockets.

=== External facilities ===
- Since May 2026, launch operations at the Wallops Flight Facility in Wallops Island, Virginia, previously managed by Goddard Space Flight Center, have been directed from KSC. The facility was established in 1945. Wallops manages NASA's sounding rocket program which supports approximately 35 missions each year. The facility also hosts the Mid-Atlantic Regional Spaceport, which provides launch facilities for commercial launch providers Northrop Grumman and Rocket Lab as well as future launches by Firefly Aerospace.

== Weather ==
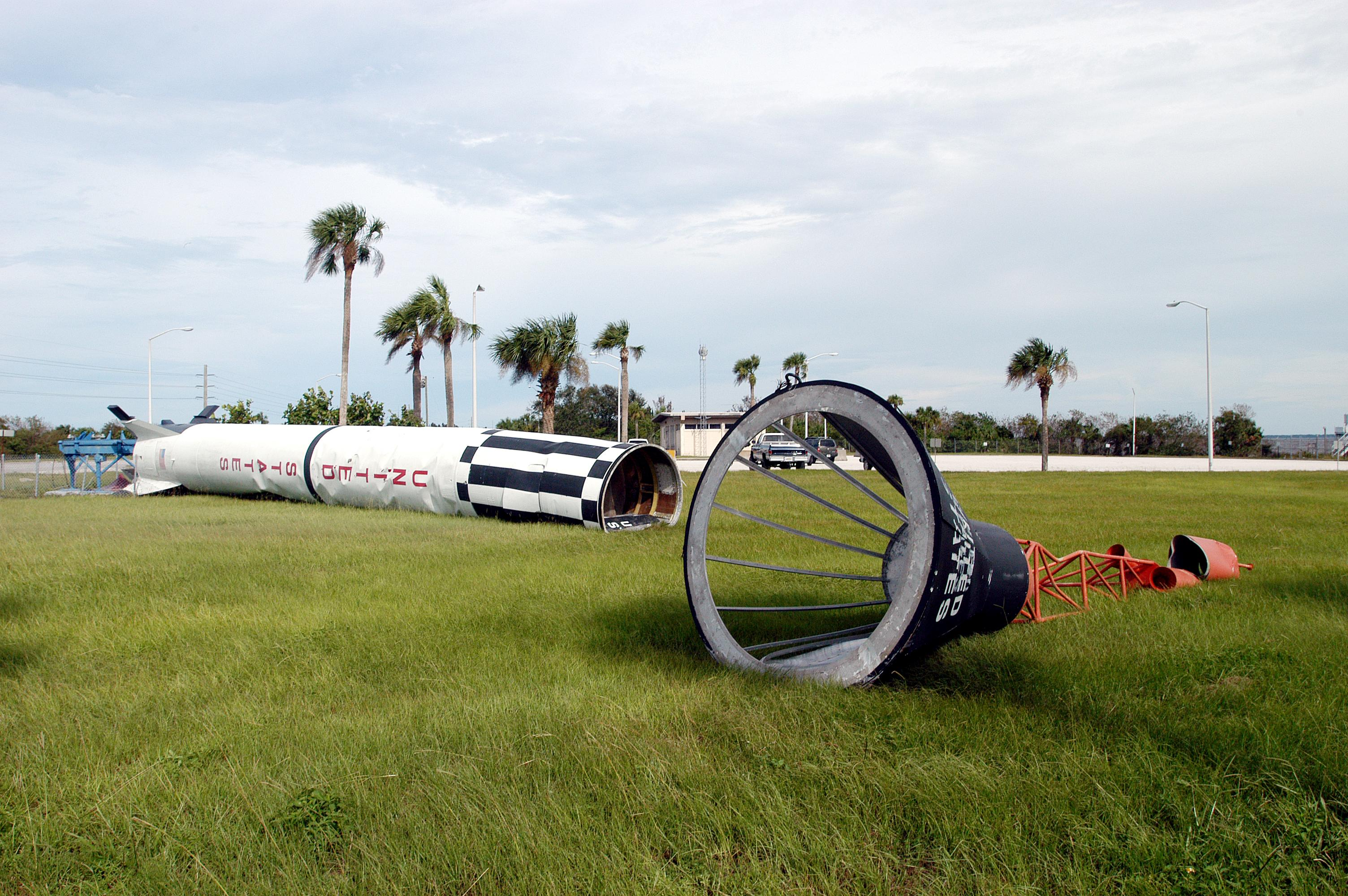
A Mercury Redstone rocket on display at Gate 3 was toppled by Hurricane Frances on September 7, 2004.

Florida's peninsular shape and temperature contrasts between land and ocean provide ideal conditions for electrical storms, earning Central Florida the reputation as "lightning capital of the United States". This makes extensive lightning protection and detection systems necessary to protect employees, structures and spacecraft on launch pads. On November 14, 1969, Apollo 12 was struck by lightning just after lift-off from Pad 39A, but the flight continued safely. The most powerful lightning strike recorded at KSC occurred at LC-39B on August 25, 2006, while shuttle Atlantis was being prepared for STS-115. NASA managers were initially concerned that the lightning strike caused damage to Atlantis, but none was found.

On September 7, 2004, Hurricane Frances directly hit the area with sustained winds of 70 miles per hour (110 km/h) and gusts up to 94 miles per hour (151 km/h), the most damaging storm to date. The Vehicle Assembly Building lost 1,000 exterior panels, each 3.9 feet (1.2 m) x 9.8 feet (3.0 m) in size. This exposed 39,800 sq ft (3,700 m^{2}) of the building to the elements. Damage occurred to the south and east sides of the VAB. The shuttle's Thermal Protection System Facility suffered extensive damage. The roof was partially torn off and the interior suffered water damage. Several rockets on display in the center were toppled. Further damage to KSC was caused by Hurricane Wilma in October 2005.

The conservative estimate by NASA is that the Space Center will experience 5 to 8 inches of sea level rise by the 2050s. Launch Complex 39A, the site of the Apollo 11 launch, is the most vulnerable to flooding, and has a 14% annual risk of flooding beginning in 2020.

== KSC directors ==
Since KSC's formation, 12 NASA officials have served as directors, including three former astronauts (Crippen, Bridges and Cabana):

No.	Image	Director	Start	End	Ref.
1		Kurt H. Debus	July 1962	November 1974	
acting		Miles Ross	November 1974	January 18, 1975	
2		Lee R. Scherer	January 19, 1975	September 25, 1979	
3		Richard G. Smith	September 26, 1979	August 2, 1986	
acting		Thomas E. Utsman	August 3, 1986	September 30, 1986	
4		Forrest S. McCartney	October 1, 1986	August 31, 1987	as USAF
4		Forrest S. McCartney	September 1, 1987	December 31, 1991	as civilian
5		Robert L. Crippen	January 1, 1992	January 21, 1995	
6		Jay F. Honeycutt	January 22, 1995	March 2, 1997	
7		Roy D. Bridges, Jr.	March 2, 1997	June 13, 2003	
acting		James W. Kennedy	June 13, 2003	August 10, 2003	
8		James W. Kennedy	August 10, 2003	January 4, 2007	
9		William W. Parsons	January 4, 2007	October 26, 2008	
10		Robert D. Cabana	October 26, 2008	May 17, 2021	
acting		Janet E. Petro	May 17, 2021	June 29, 2021	
11		Janet E. Petro	June 30, 2021	May 1, 2026	
acting		Kelvin Manning	May 1, 2026	May 22, 2026	
12		Brian Hughes	May 22, 2026	present	

== In popular culture ==
In addition to being frequently featured in documentaries, Kennedy Space Center has been portrayed on film many times. Some studio movies have even gained access and filmed scenes within the gates of the space center. If extras are needed in those scenes, space center employees are recruited (employees use personal time during filming). Films with scenes at KSC include:

- Moonraker
- Stowaway to the Moon
- SpaceCamp
- Apollo 13
- Contact
- Armageddon
- Space Cowboys
- Swades
- Transformers: Dark of the Moon
- Tomorrowland
- Sharknado 3: Oh Hell No!
- First Man
- Geostorm
- Men in Black 3
- Fly Me to the Moon
- Simon

The location appears as a major plot point in the finale of Stone Ocean, the 6th part of the manga and anime series JoJo's Bizarre Adventure.

KSC is also one of the two primary settings of the 1965–1970 television series I Dream of Jeannie (along with a home in nearby Cocoa Beach), though it was filmed entirely in Los Angeles.

== See also ==
- Air Force Space and Missile Museum
- Astronaut beach house
- Launch Complex 34 – used for the smaller Apollo Saturn I and Saturn IB rockets
- Launch Complex 37 – used for the smaller Apollo Saturn I and Saturn IB rockets
- List of memorials to John F. Kennedy
- List of tallest buildings and structures in the world
- Mobile launcher platform
- NASA Causeway
- Solar eclipse of August 12, 2045 (Kennedy Space Center will be in the path of totality)
- Swamp Works
- Crawler-transporter
