= DeSoto Next Generation Solar Energy Center =

Solar power plant in Florida

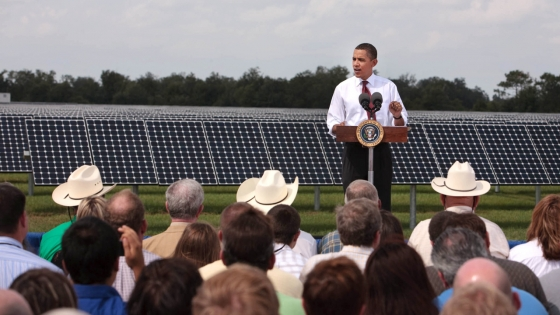
- President Barack Obama speaking at the DeSoto Next Generation Solar Energy Center
- Country: United States
- Location: Arcadia, DeSoto County, Florida, U.S.
- Coordinates: 27°19′N 81°48′W
- Status: Operational
- Commission date: October 27, 2009
- Construction cost: $150 million
- Owner: Florida Power & Light

Solar farm
- Type: Flat-panel PV
- Site area: 235 acres (95 ha)

Power generation
- Units operational: 90,000 SunPower solar panels
- Make and model: solar cell panel (90000)
- Nameplate capacity: 25 MW; Planned: 300 MW
- Annual net output: 42 GWh

External links
- Website: www.fpl.com/environment/solar/desoto.shtml
- Commons: Related media on Commons

The DeSoto Next Generation Solar Energy Center is a photovoltaic power station in Arcadia, DeSoto County, in the U.S. state of Florida, owned by Florida Power & Light (FPL). President Barack Obama attended the plant's commissioning on October 27, 2009. It has a nameplate capacity of 25 megawatts (MW), and produces an estimated 42,000 megawatt hours (MW·h) of electricity per year (an average output of about 4.8 MW).

The plant cost $150 million to construct. The plant consists of over 90,000 SunPower solar panels with single-axis trackers on 235 acres (95 ha).

FPL must obtain a permit for construction of the second stage, and has filed for the permit to build the third stage of the plant. At the second stage, 49 MW of capacity will be added. At the third stage, 226 MW of capacity is planned to be added, bringing the total capacity of the plant up to 300 MW.

== Production ==
Generation (MW·h) of DeSoto Next Generation Solar Energy
Year	Jan	Feb	Mar	Apr	May	Jun	Jul	Aug	Sep	Oct	Nov	Dec	Total
2009										3,876	3,179	2,415	9,470
2010	3,526	3,038	4,399	5,062	5,307	5,485	4,680	4,682	4,927	4,755	3,849	3,631	53,341
2011	3,167	3,459	5,096	5,923	5,845	3,773	5,042	4,605	4,262	3,842	3,648	3,183	51,845
2012	3,707	3,179	5,239	5,321	5,549	4,364	5,314	4,667	4,156	3,955	3,502	3,095	52,048
2013	3,220	3,528	5,099	4,713	5,508	4,342	4,413	4,748	4,209	4,450	2,813	2,784	49,827
2014	2,888	3,463	4,453	1,702	5,585	4,905	4,870	4,944	3,798	4,600	3,263	2,950	47,421
2015	3,190	3,601	4,532	4,844	6,060	5,098	4,711	4,350	3,878	3,845	3,157	2,770	50,036
2016	2,758	3,465	4,207	4,555	5,536	4,356	5,082	4,241	4,213	4,031	3,413	2,793	48,650
Total													362,638

== See also ==
- Solar power in the United States
- Space Coast Next Generation Solar Energy Center
