= Space Coast Next Generation Solar Energy Center =

Photovoltaic power plant located in the Kennedy Space Center in Florida

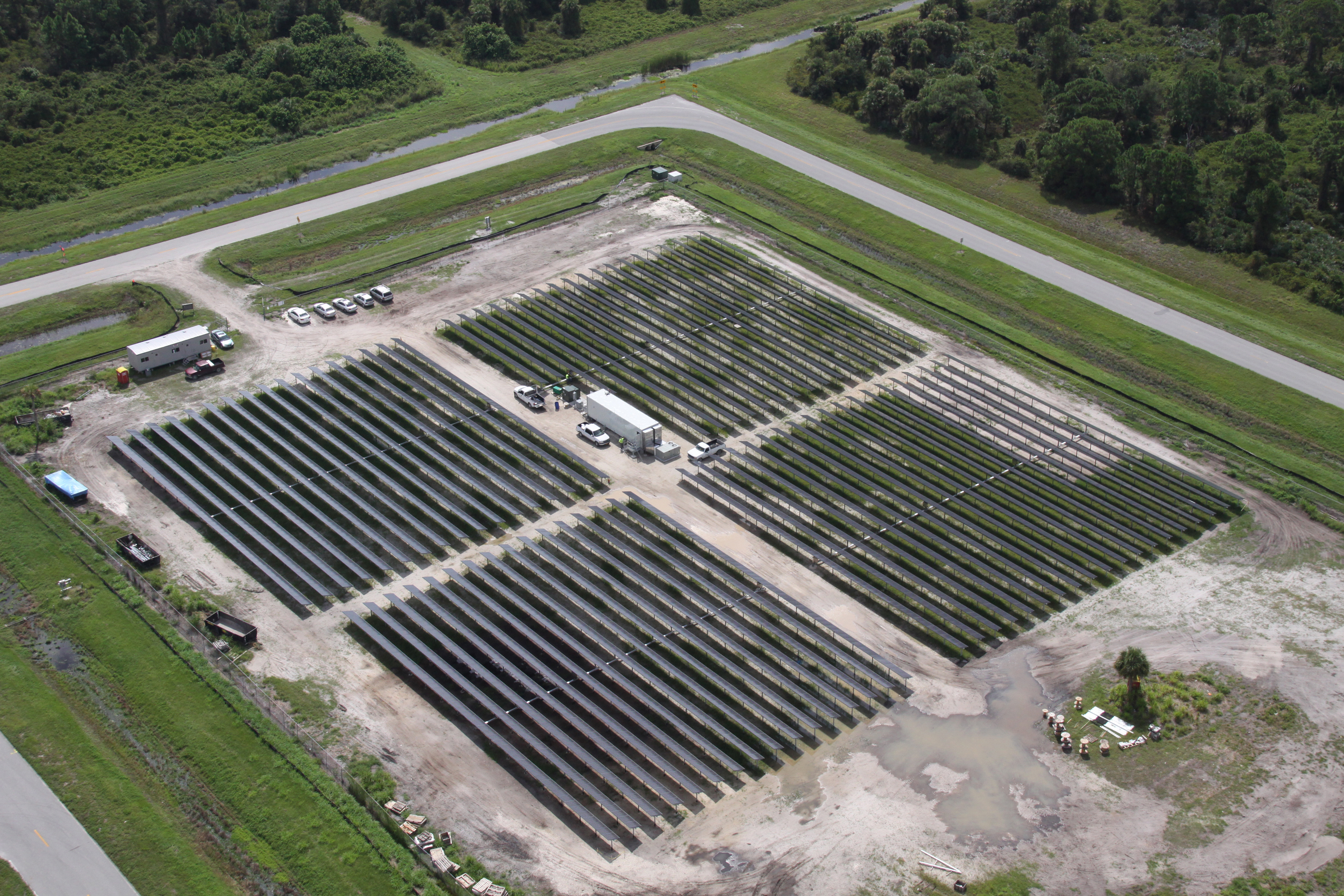
- Country: United States
- Location: Kennedy Space Center, Florida
- Coordinates: 28°29′07″N 80°40′53″W
- Commission date: April 8, 2010

Solar farm
- Type: Flat-panel PV
- Site area: 60 acres (0.2 km^{2})

Power generation
- Units operational: 35,000
- Nameplate capacity: 10 MW

The Space Coast Next Generation Solar Energy Center is a 10 megawatt (MW) solar photovoltaic (PV) facility at the Kennedy Space Center, Florida. Commissioned in April 2010, the center is the result of a partnership between NASA and Florida Power & Light. The facility has approximately 35,000 solar photovoltaic panels from SunPower covering an area of 60 acres. The facility provides slightly less than one percent of the power needed to keep Kennedy Space Center up and running.

A 1 MW solar photovoltaic array is also located at the Kennedy Space Center.

The Space Coast Next Generation Solar Energy Center was the second largest-scale solar facility in Florida, with the 25 MW DeSoto Next Generation Solar Energy Center being the largest, until the construction of the 75 MW Martin Next Generation Solar Energy Center.

== Production ==
Generation (MW·h) of Space Coast Next Gen Solar Energy
Year	Jan	Feb	Mar	Apr	May	Jun	Jul	Aug	Sep	Oct	Nov	Dec	Total
2010			266	1,883	1,851	1,772	1,641	1,639	1,663	1,681	1,481	1,395	15,272
2011	1,285	1,429	1,829	1,909	1,852	1,793	1,708	1,508	1,540	1,412	1,362	1,215	18,842
2012	1,540	1,293	1,863	1,828	1,761	1,482	1,815	1,471	1,543	1,361	1,386	1,165	18,508
2013	1,275	1,447	1,877	1,640	1,725	1,518	1,576	1,705	1,498	1,631	1,044	1,233	18,169
2014	1,092	1,283	1,655	1,702	1,841	1,526	1,496	1,618	1,330	1,697	1,208	1,103	17,551
2015	1,303	1,315	1,687	1,589	1,903	1,645	1,609	1,489	1,356	1,416	1,272	1,098	17,682
2016	1,114	1,562	1,619	1,816	1,813	1,568	1,857	1,612	1,403	1,336	1,372	1,228	18,300
2017	928	1,132	1,394	1,518	1,660	1,420	1,584	1,430	1,374	1,196	1,057	864	15,557
2018	1,163	1,266	1,837	1,777	1,384	1,555	1,549	1,564	1,511	1,572	1,216	1,152	17,546
2019	1,055	1,120	1,577	1,673	1,700	1,439	1,454	1,373	1,579	1,343	1,214	1,027	16,554
2020	1,013	1,096	1,461	1,324	1,562	1,348	1,382	1,319	1,142	1,115	975	1,061	14,798
2021	1,154	1,171	1,527	1,642	1,839	1,358	1,448	1,377	1,347	1,364	1,132	1,072	16,431
Total													205,210

== See also ==
- Copper Mountain Solar Facility
- List of photovoltaic power stations
- Renewable energy in the United States
- Renewable portfolio standard
- Solar power in the United States
