= Multi-Payload Processing Facility =

Spacecraft and payload processing facility at NASA's Kennedy Space Center

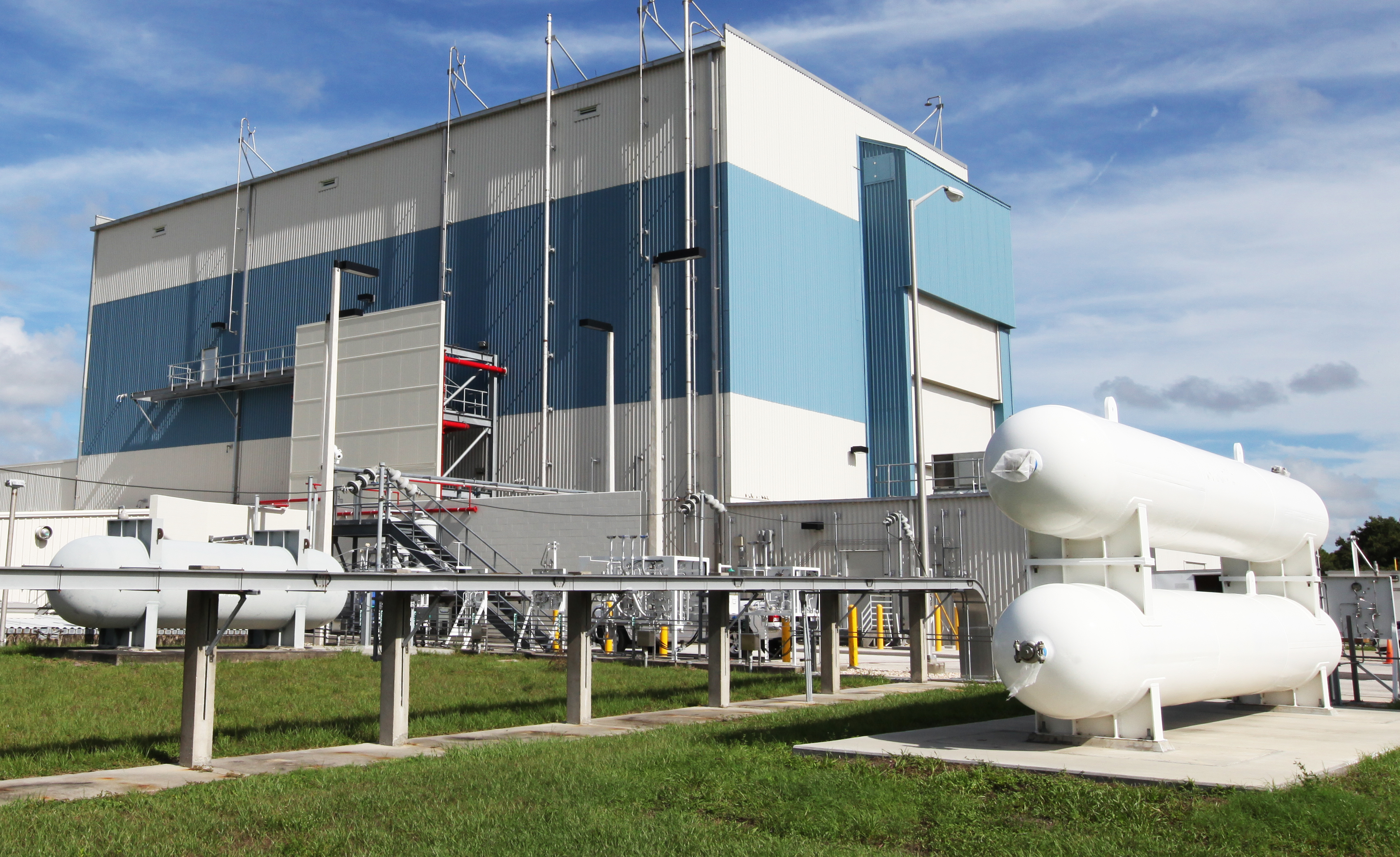
- The exterior of the Multi-Payload Processing Facility
- Built: 1994 or 1995
- Location: 6th St SE Merritt Island, FL 32953; Kennedy Space Center
- Coordinates: 28°30′49.6″N 80°38′50.4″W
- Industry: Aerospace and Space Technology
- Buildings: 2
- Area: 1,825.3 m^{2} (19,647 sq ft)
- Volume: 14,800 m^{3} (524,000 ft^{3}) (Note: Calculated from source.)

The Multi-Payload Processing Facility (MPPF) is a facility at Kennedy Space Center constructed by NASA in either 1994 or 1995 and used for spacecraft and payload processing. Prior to being assigned the role of processing the Orion spacecraft, the MPPF was used to process solely non-hazardous payloads.

== Layout ==
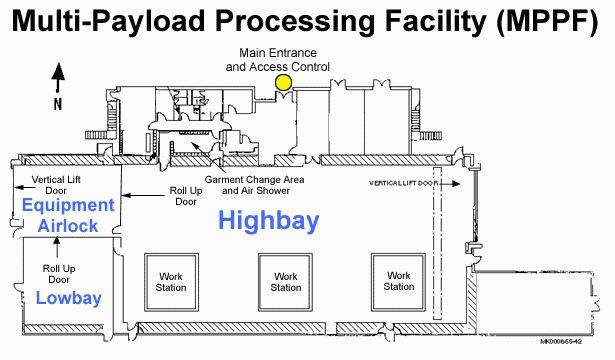
The floor plan of the MPPF

The interior of the primary MPPF building is divided into a low bay, high bay, and equipment airlock.

The high bay is certified for the processing of hazardous materials such as high-pressure gasses, hypergolic propellant, ammonia, oxygen, and fluorocarbons. It has a usable floor space of 40 m × 18 m (132 ft × 60 ft) with a ceiling height of 19 m (62 ft). It is equipped with an 18 t (20 short tons) bridge crane with a hook height of 15 m (49 ft) and a 12.2 m × 9.1 m (40 ft × 30 ft) vertical door. The low bay has a usable floor space of 10 m × 10 m (34 ft × 34 ft) with a ceiling height of 6.1 m (20 ft). Both the high bay and low bay are class 100,000 cleanrooms.

The airlock has a usable floor space of 11.9 m × 8.8 m (39 ft × 29 ft) with a ceiling height of 6.1 m (20 ft) and is a class 300,000 cleanroom. It is equipped with a 4.6 m × 6.1 m (15 ft × 20 ft) door.

== Usage ==
After its construction, the MPPF was used for the processing of both Space Shuttle and Launch Services Program payloads. Following the end of the Shuttle program in 2011, it is slated to process the Orion spacecraft, and is also available to process hazardous or non-hazardous Space Launch System (SLS) payloads if necessary.

Design work on upgrading the MPPF for Orion processing began in 2007 during the Constellation program, but actual installation and modification work began in 2013.

Orion spacecraft processing will be performed by the Spacecraft and Offline Operations team while the SLS is being stacked on the Mobile Launcher in the Vehicle Assembly Building. During this time flight commodities will be loaded into the spacecraft. These flight commodities include monomethyl hydrazine fuel and nitrogen tetroxide oxidizer used in Orion's propulsion systems, ammonia coolant for thermal control, and Freon for the service module's radiator system. The MPPF will also be used to de-service Orion capsules that have returned from space and remove any residual flight commodities.

Due to the hazardous materials involved, loading and unloading of flight commodities will be remotely monitored and controlled from one of the firing rooms inside the Launch Control Center and performed by technicians wearing Self Contained Atmospheric Protective Ensemble (SCAPE) hazmat suits.

On January 16 2021, The Artemis 1 Orion spacecraft began fueling and pre-launch servicing in the MPPF following a handover to exploration ground systems.

== Gallery ==
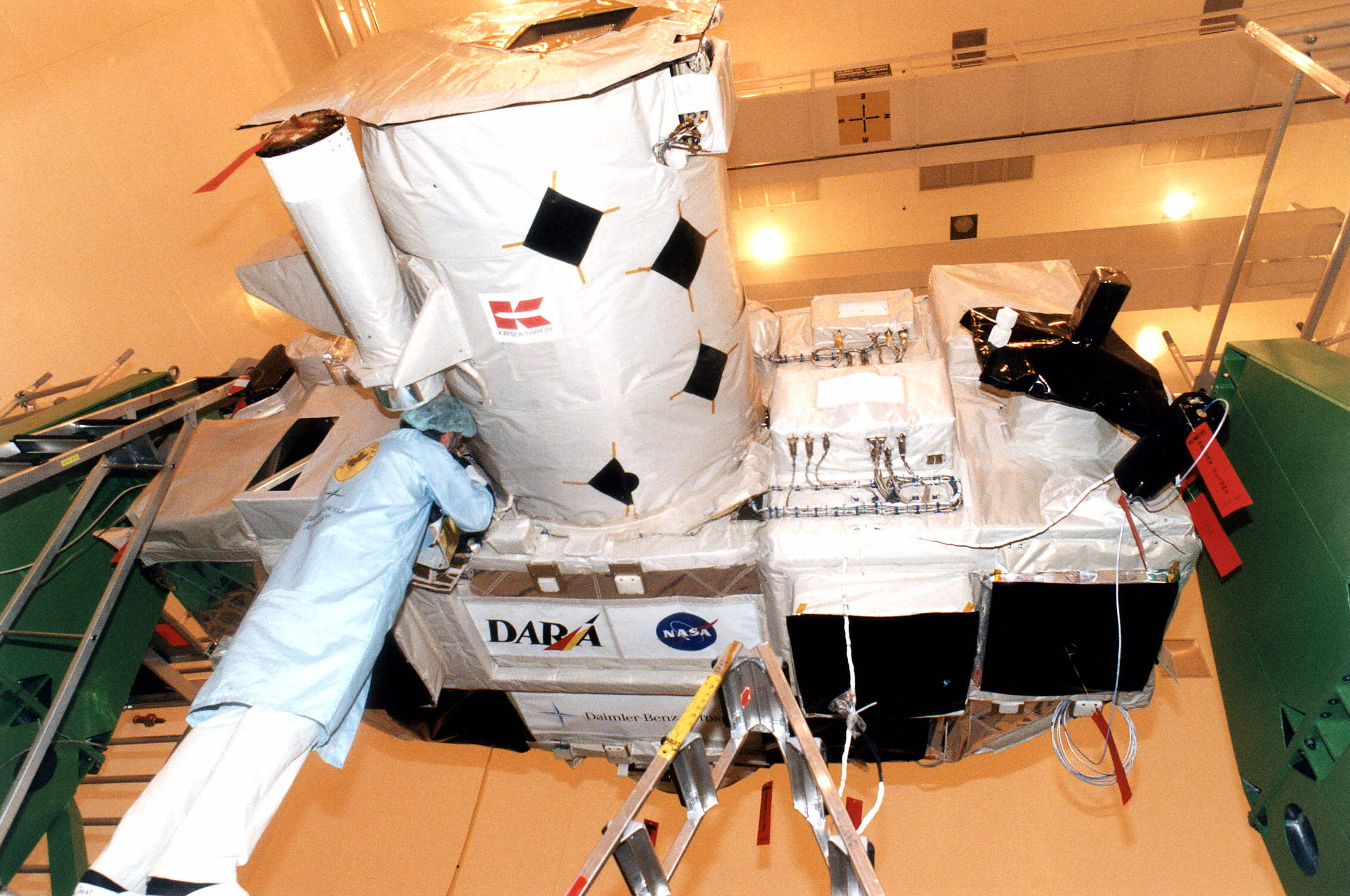
The ORFEUS-SPAS-2 satellite is prepared in the MPPF for STS-80, which launched in November 1996

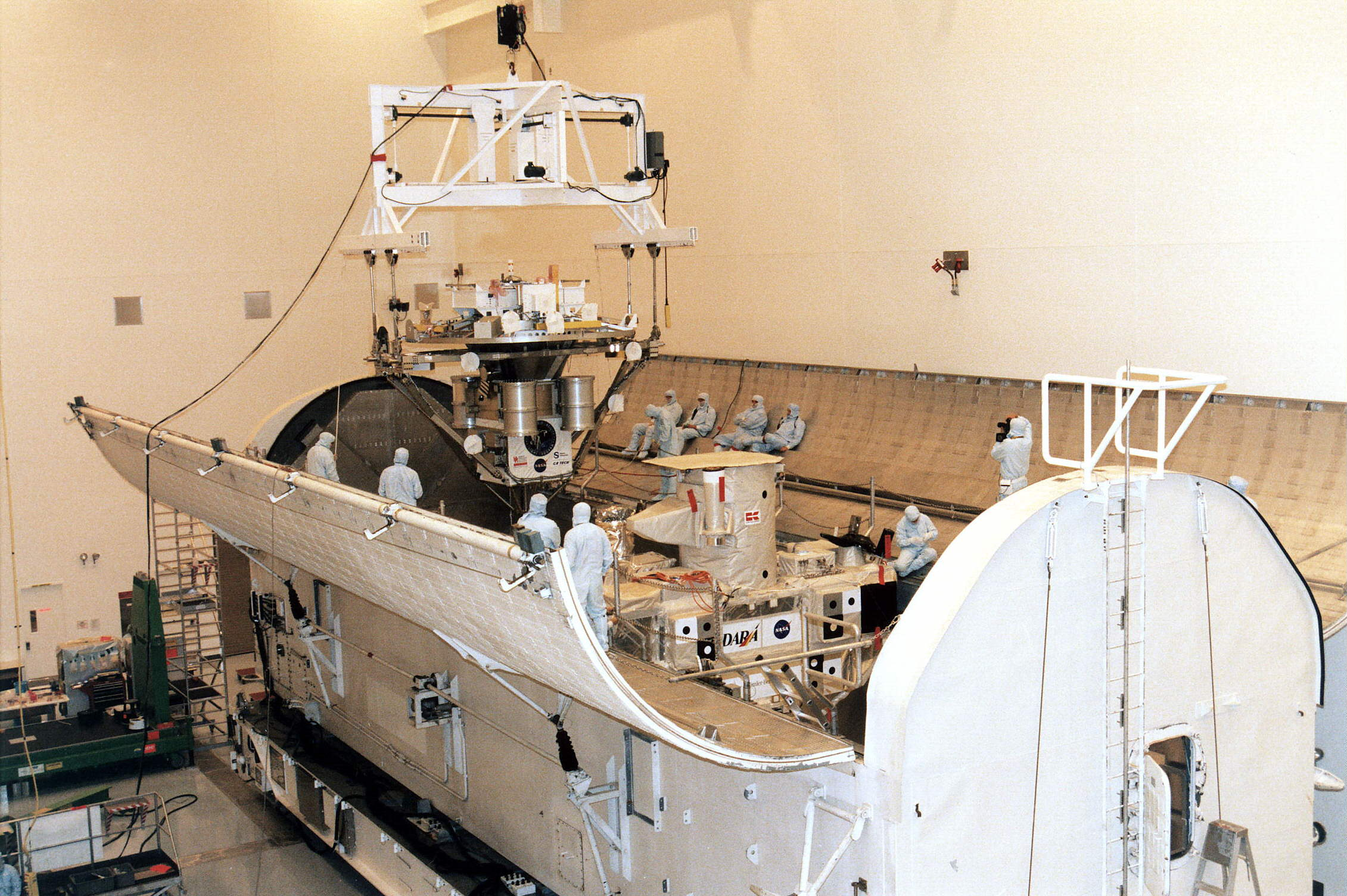
The Wake Shield Facility-3 (WSF-3) is lowered into the payload canister for STS-80 in the MPPF

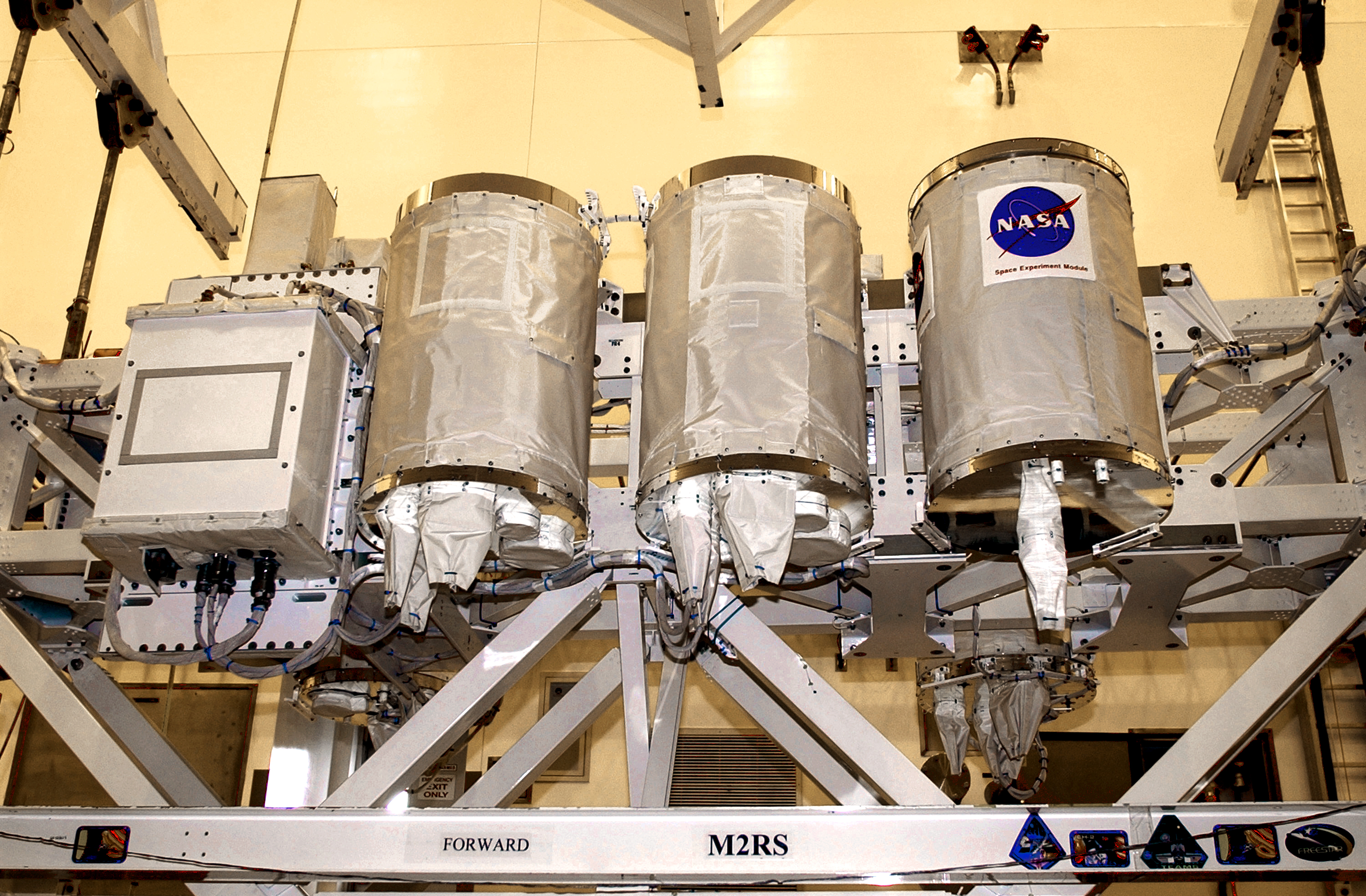
A payload for STS-107 awaiting transfer to the payload canister

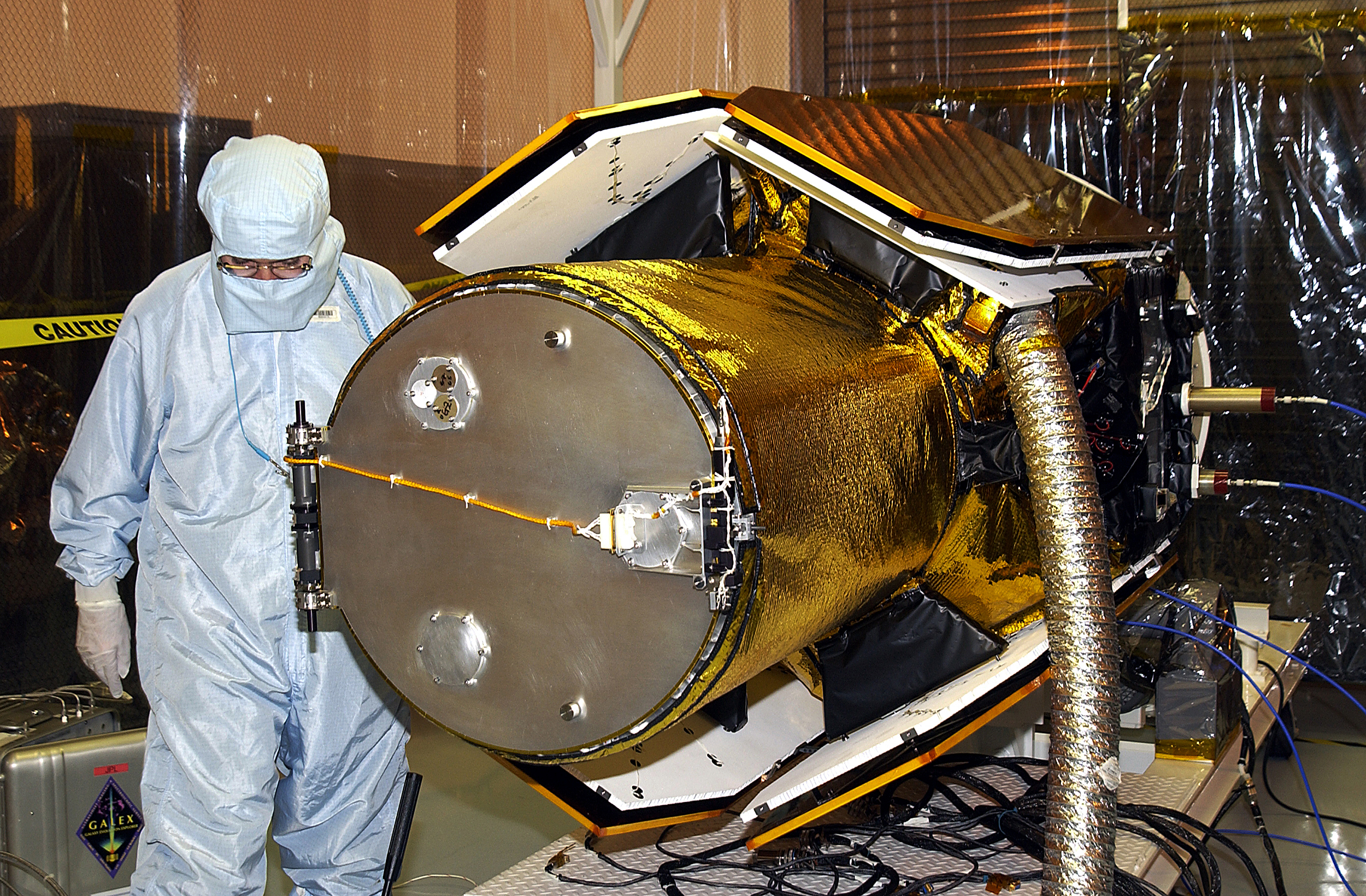
The Galaxy Evolution Explorer (GALEX) in the MPPF prior to its launch in 2003

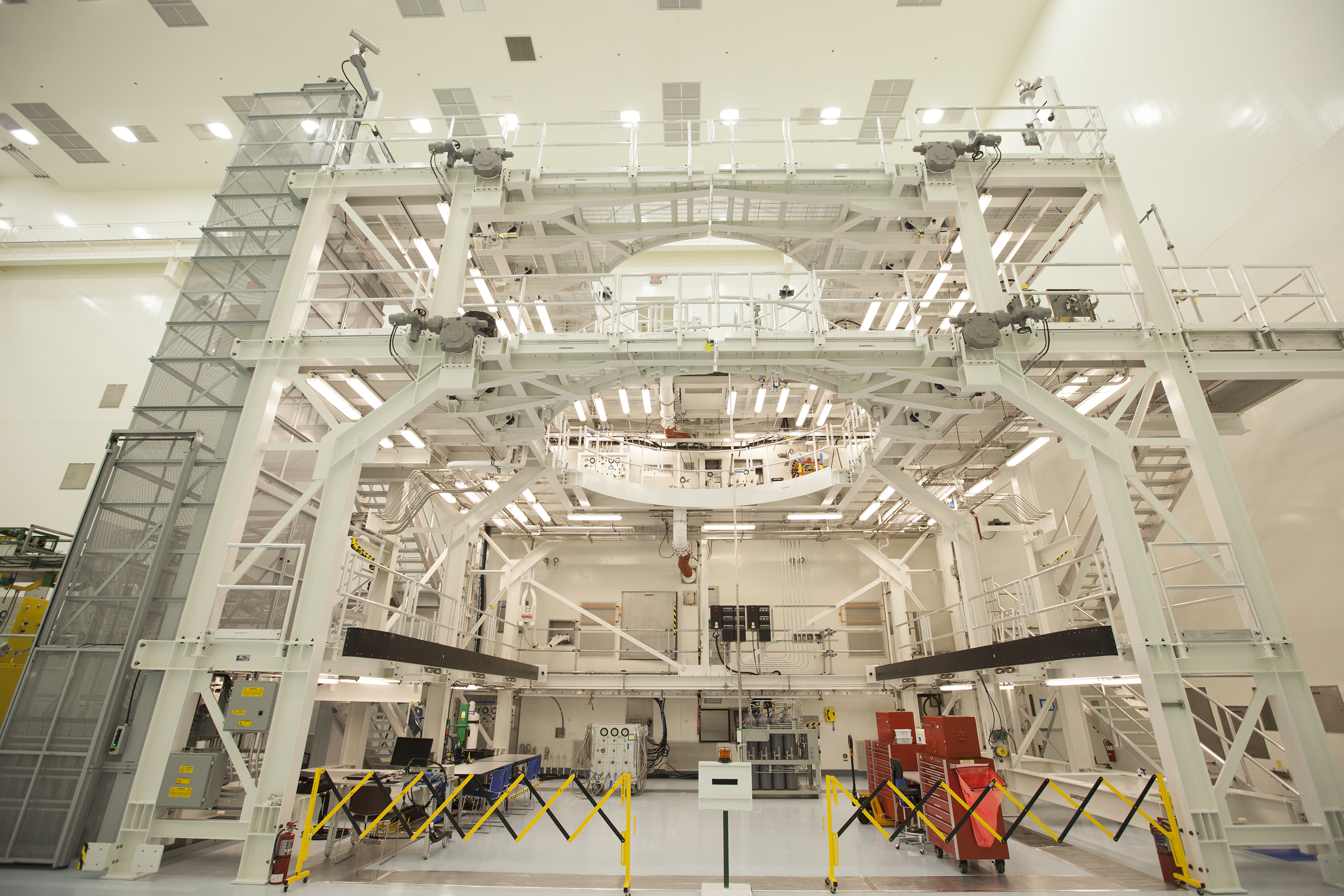
The Orion service platform in 2016, shortly after its completion

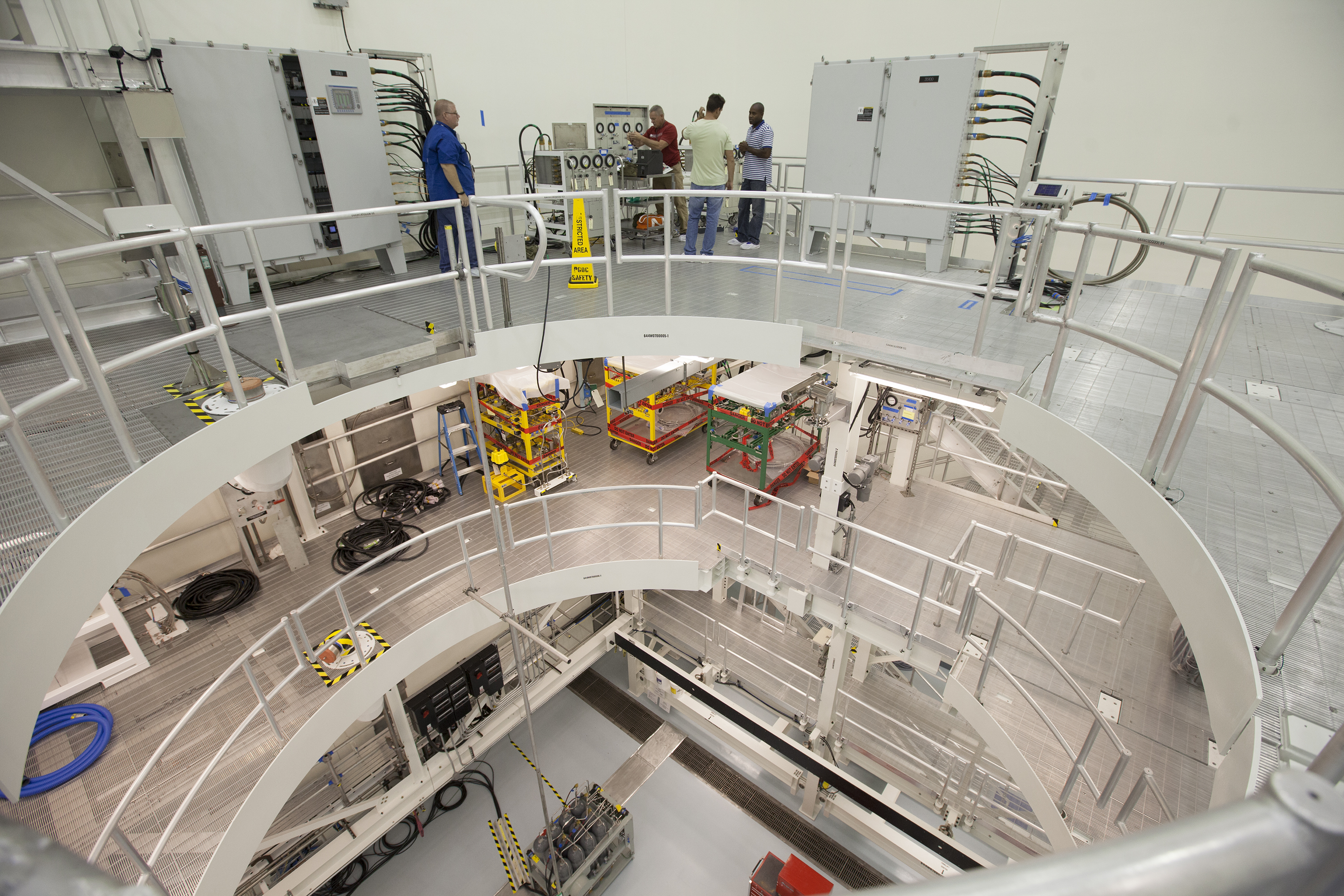
View of the Orion service platform from the top level

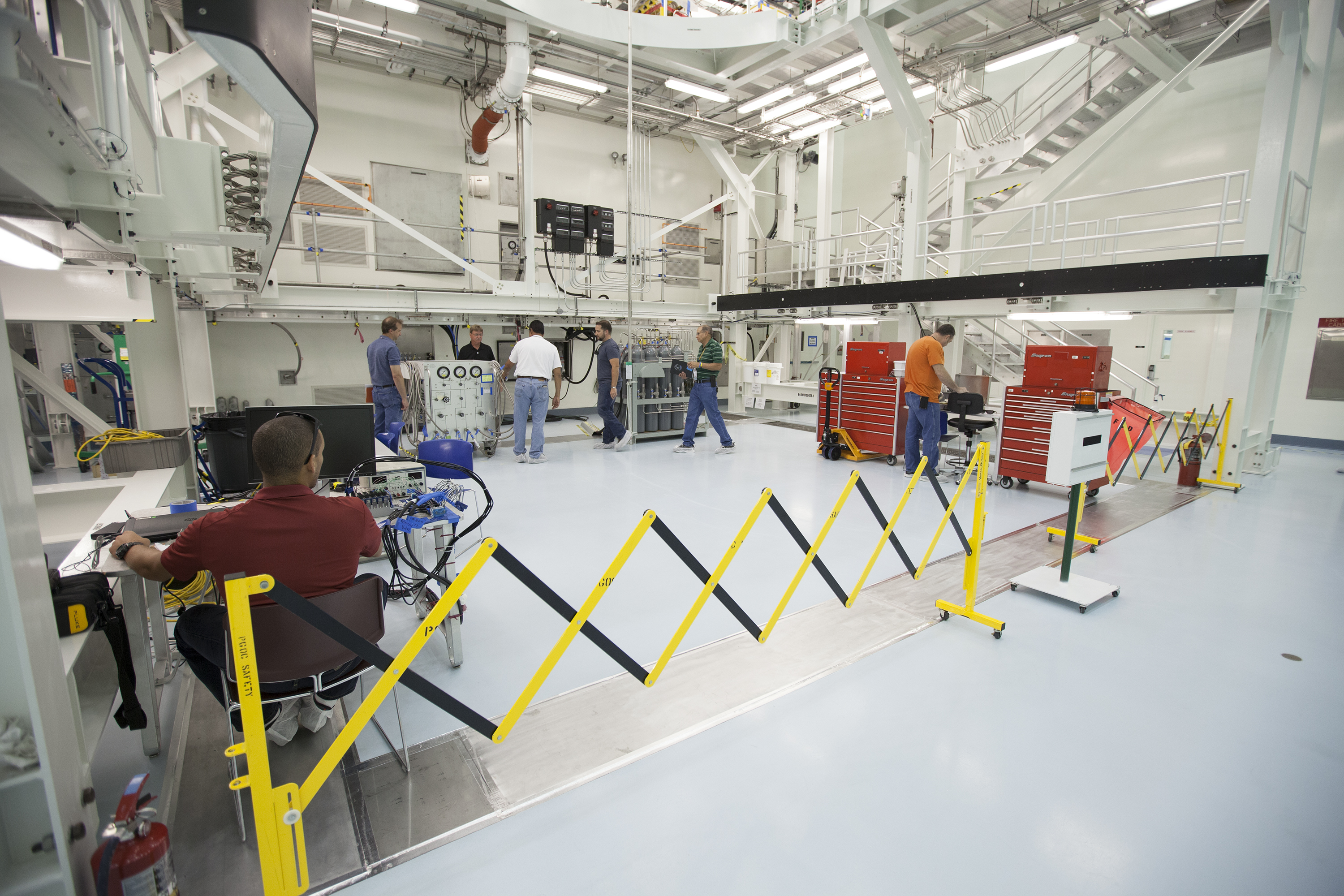
Engineers and technicians testing systems and equipment for fueling the Orion spacecraft in August 2016

== See also ==
- Payload Hazardous Servicing Facility
- Space Station Processing Facility
- Orbiter Processing Facility
