= Crawlerway =

- U.S. National Register of Historic Places
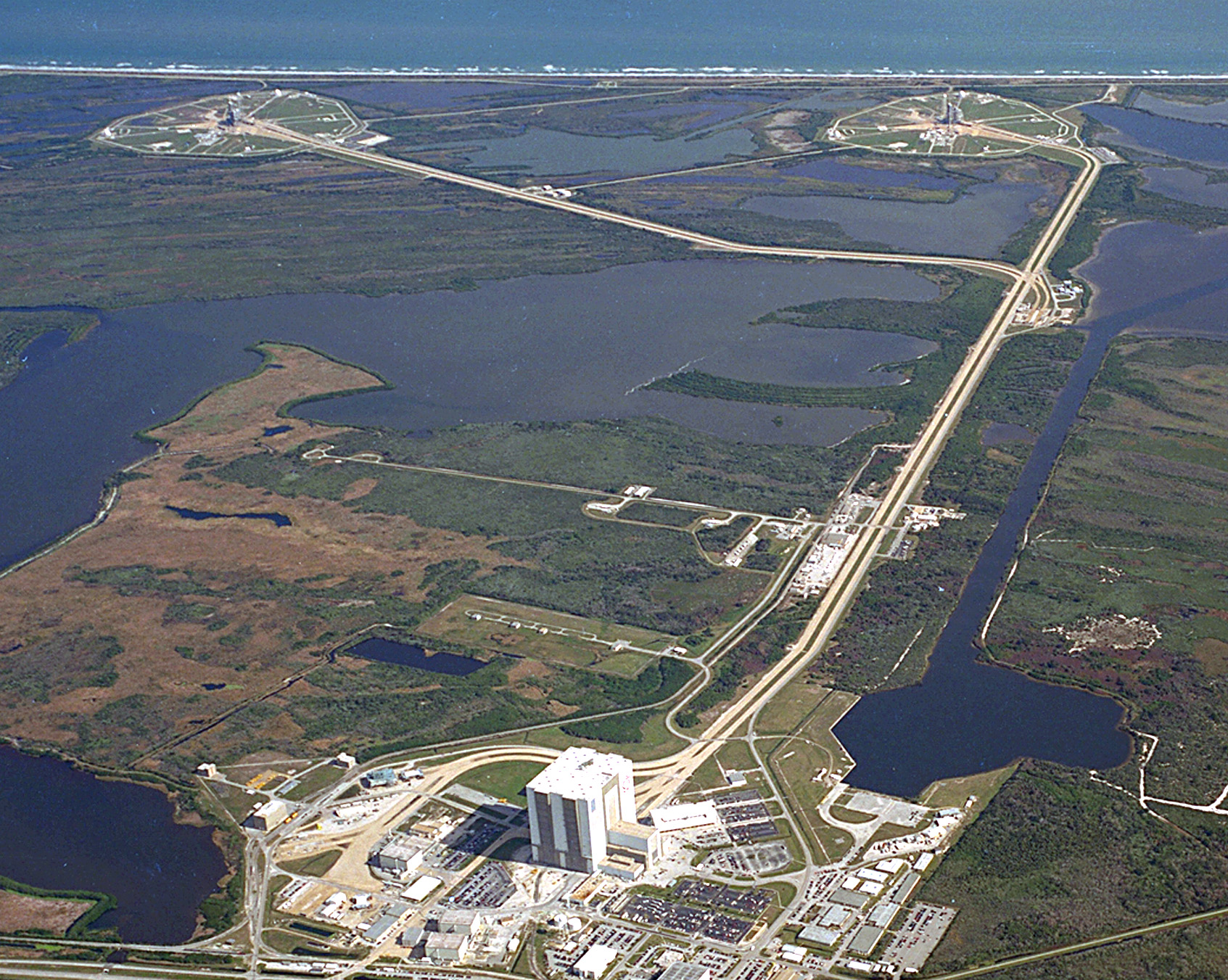
- Aerial view of Launch Complex 39. The Crawlerway is the pathway between the Vehicle Assembly Building and Pads 39A and 39B.

- Location within Florida Location within the United States
- Location: Brevard County, Florida United States
- Nearest city: Merritt Island
- Coordinates: 28°36′13″N 80°37′39″W
- Built: 1964
- MPS: John F. Kennedy Space Center MPS
- NRHP reference No.: 99001641
- Added to NRHP: January 21, 2000

Facilities and geographic features of Kennedy Space Center
Facilities and geographical features of Kennedy Space Center:
1 Launch Complex 39 (LC-39A)
2 Launch Complex 39 (LC-39B)
3 Vehicle Assembly Building
4 Shuttle Landing Facility
5 Kennedy Space Center Visitor Complex
6 Apollo/Saturn V Center
7 Banana River
8 Indian River
9 KSC Headquarters Building
10 Astronaut Beach House
11 Banana Creek
12 Cochran Cove
13 Operations and Checkout Building
14 Launch Complex 48
15 SpaceX Roberts Road Operations Center
16 Exploration Park
17 Blue Origin Ransom Road facility
18 Crawlerway
19 Launch Control Center
20 Orbiter Processing Facilities 1 and 2
21 Orbiter Processing Facility 3
22 Launch Complex 39 Press Site
23 Multi-Payload Processing Facility
24 Space Systems Processing Facility
25 NASA Railroad (Wilson Junction)

The Crawlerway is a 130-foot-wide (40 m) double pathway at the Kennedy Space Center in Florida. It runs between the Vehicle Assembly Building and the two launch pads at Launch Complex 39. It has a length of 3.4 and 4.2 miles (5.5 and 6.8 km) to Pad 39A and Pad 39B, respectively. A seven-foot (2 m) bed of stones lies beneath a layer of asphalt and a surface made of Alabama river rocks.

The Crawlerway was originally designed to support the weight of the Saturn V rocket and its payload, plus the Launch Umbilical Tower and mobile launcher platform, atop a crawler-transporter during the Apollo program. It was also used from 1981 to 2011 to transport the lighter Space Shuttles to their launch pads.

Construction of the Crawlerway connected Merritt Island with the mainland, forming a peninsula. The main vehicle access road to and from the launch pads, the Saturn Causeway, runs alongside the Crawlerway.

== Construction ==
The Crawlerway is composed of two 40-foot-wide (12 m) lanes, separated by a 50-foot (15 m) median. The top layer is Alabama river rock, 4 inches (10 cm) thick on the straight sections and 8 inches (20 cm) thick on curves. Alabama river rock was chosen for many properties, including hardness, roundness, sphericity and LA abrasion test score. Beneath that is 4 feet (1.2 m) of graded, crushed stone, resting on two layers of fill. By 2013, a project to repair and upgrade the Crawlerway was undertaken, the first time since it was constructed that the foundation had been repaired. Additional rock was added to the surface in June 2014.

== Gallery ==
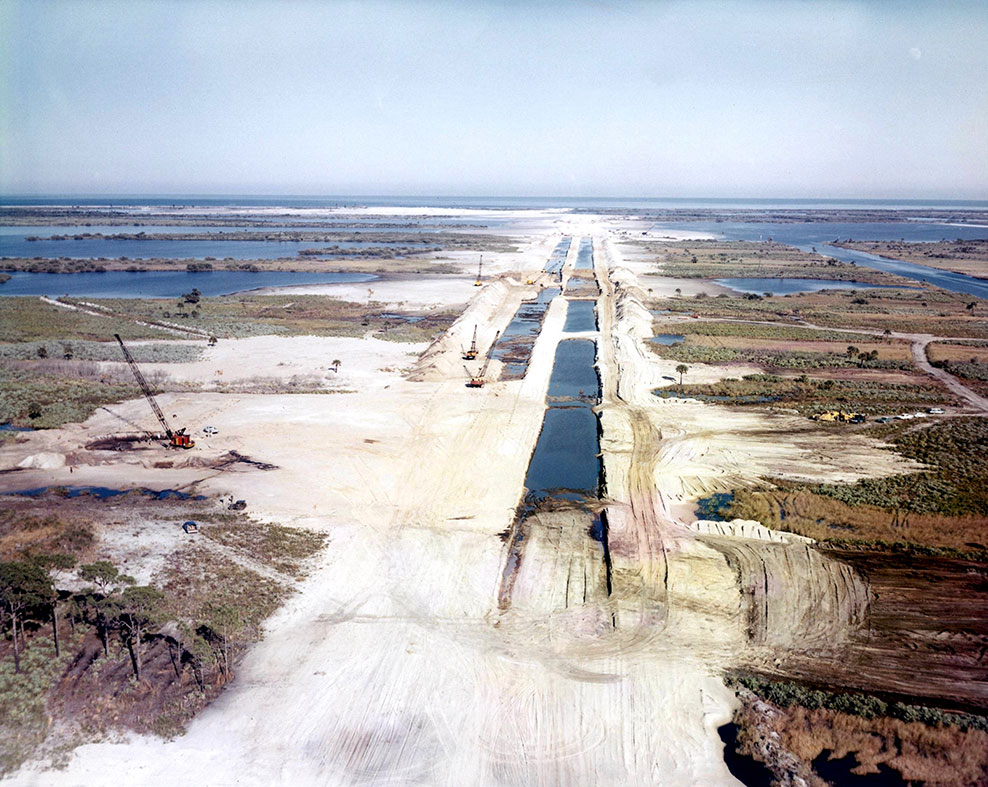
Crawlerway under construction in December 1963

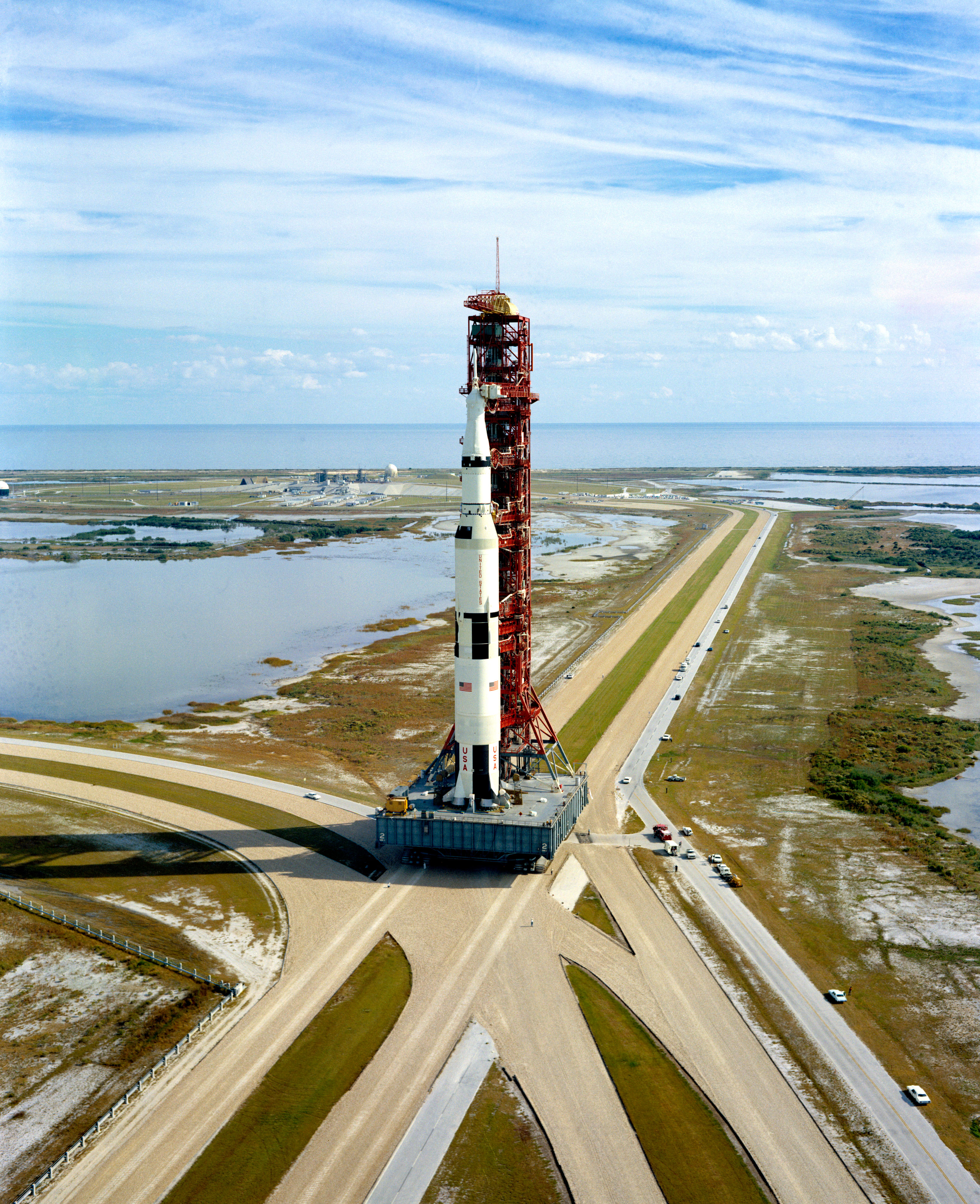
Apollo 14 rolls to Pad 39A in November 1970

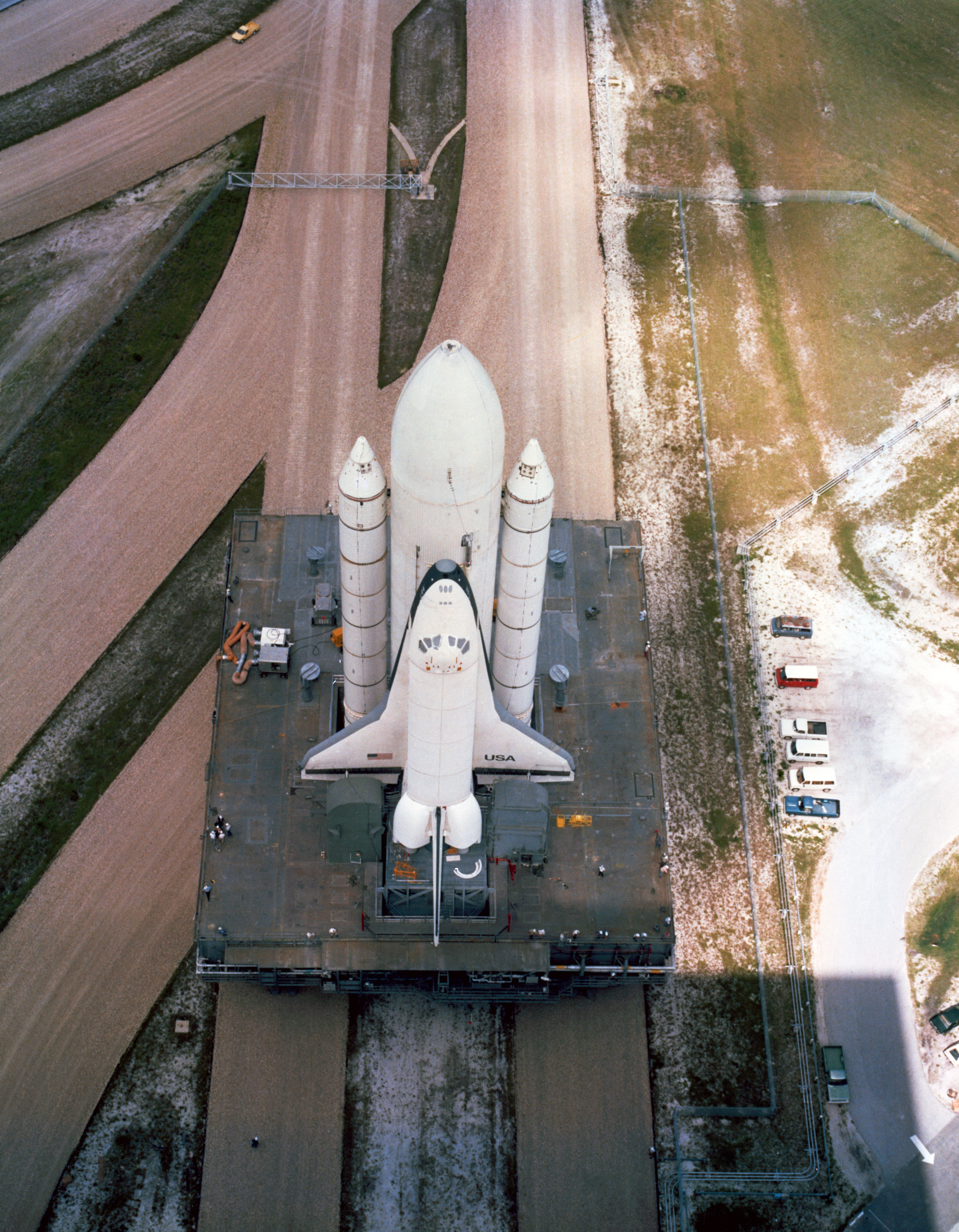
The prototype Space Shuttle Enterprise begins its journey down the Crawlerway from Pad 39A to the VAB in July 1979 following a series of fit-checks

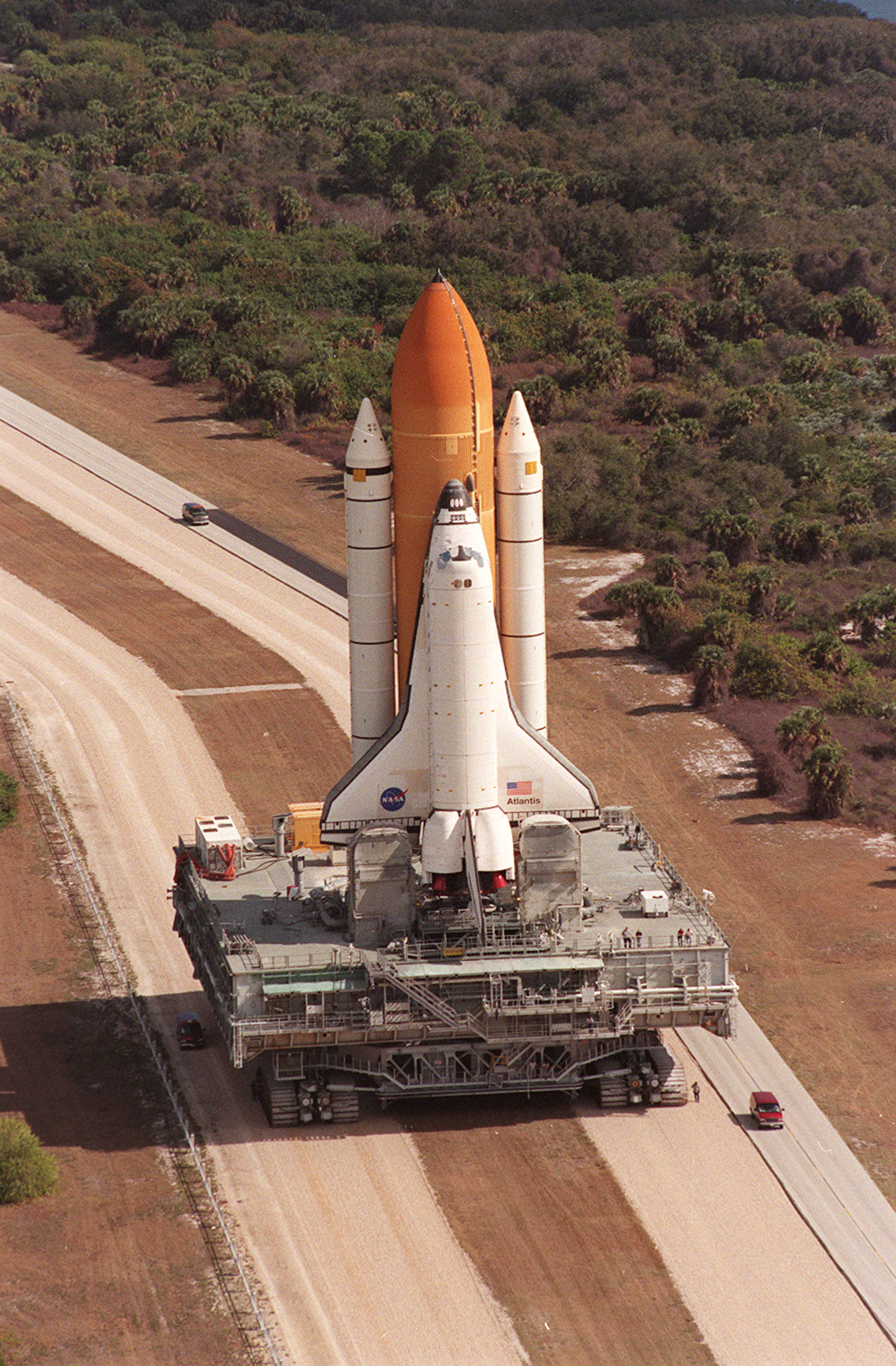
The Space Shuttle Atlantis is moved back to the VAB in January 2001 after the launch of STS-98 was scrubbed

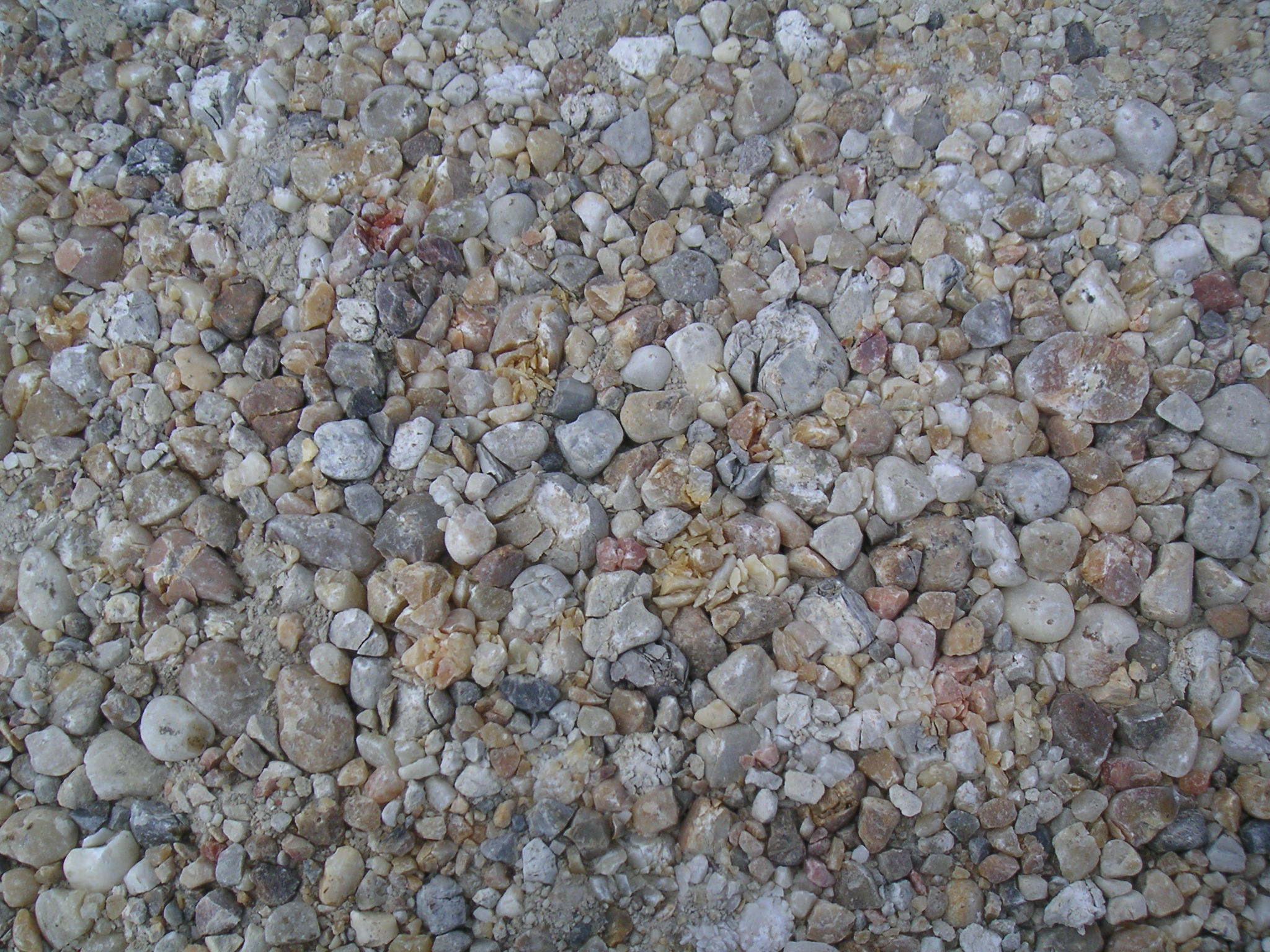
Close up of Crawlerway in April 2005; originally smooth, the rocks have been crushed after many passages by the crawler-transporters
