= Shuttle Landing Facility =

Runway located at Kennedy Space Center

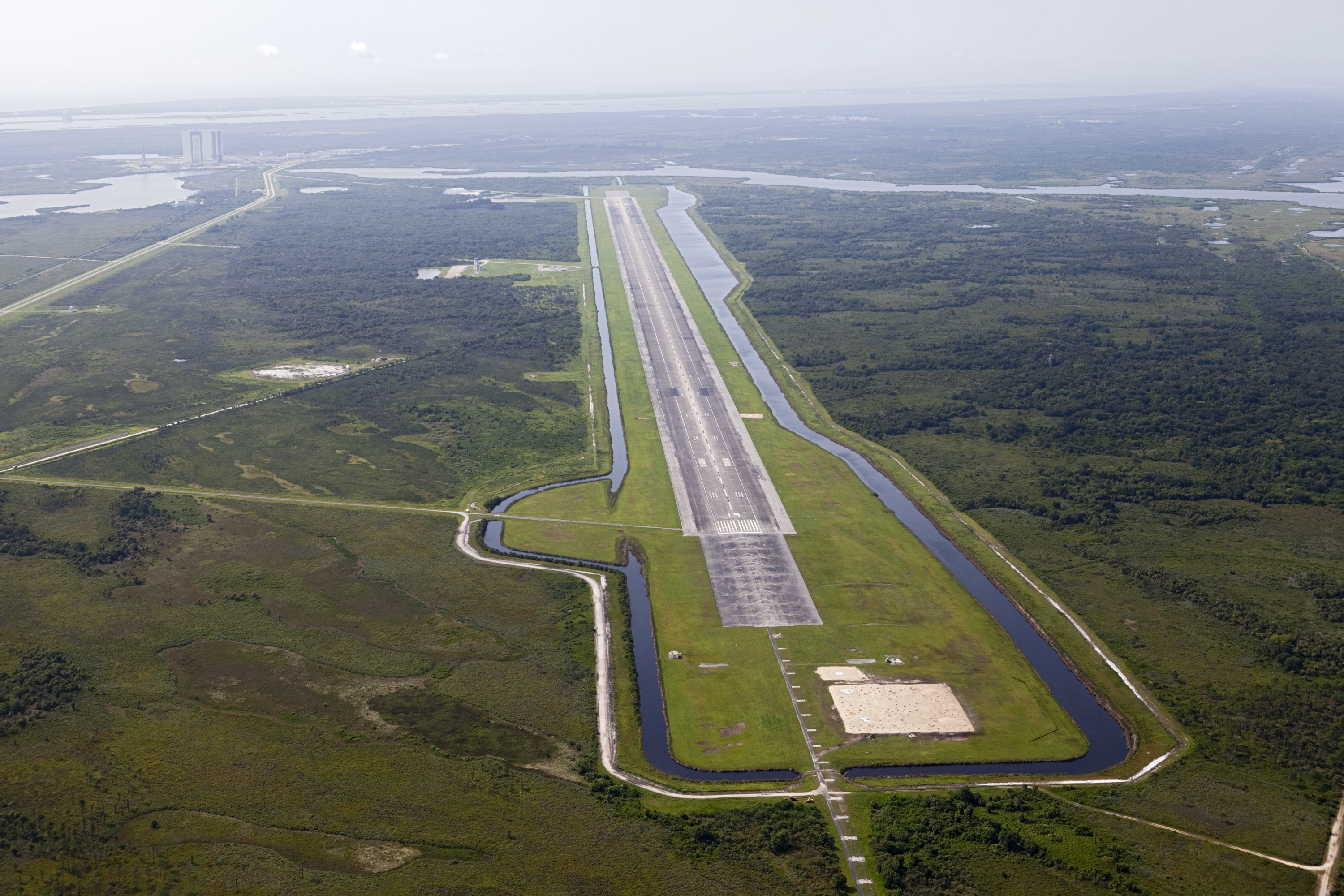
- Aerial view of Shuttle Landing Facility in 2012
- IATA: QQS; ICAO: KTTS; FAA LID: TTS

Summary
- Airport type: Government/Private
- Owner: NASA
- Operator: NASA (1976–2015); Space Florida (2015–present)
- Location: Merritt Island, Florida
- Opened: 1976
- Built: 1974
- Occupants: Kennedy Space Center
- Elevation AMSL: 10 ft (3.0 m)
- Coordinates: 28.615°N 80.6945°W

Map
- Location of airport in Florida

Runways
Direction	Length		Surface
Direction	ft	m	Surface
15/33	15,000	4,572	Concrete

Facilities and geographic features of Kennedy Space Center
Facilities and geographical features of Kennedy Space Center:
1 Launch Complex 39 (LC-39A)
2 Launch Complex 39 (LC-39B)
3 Vehicle Assembly Building
4 Shuttle Landing Facility
5 Kennedy Space Center Visitor Complex
6 Apollo/Saturn V Center
7 Banana River
8 Indian River
9 KSC Headquarters Building
10 Astronaut Beach House
11 Banana Creek
12 Cochran Cove
13 Operations and Checkout Building
14 Launch Complex 48
15 SpaceX Roberts Road Operations Center
16 Exploration Park
17 Blue Origin Ransom Road facility
18 Crawlerway
19 Launch Control Center
20 Orbiter Processing Facilities 1 and 2
21 Orbiter Processing Facility 3
22 Launch Complex 39 Press Site
23 Multi-Payload Processing Facility
24 Space Systems Processing Facility
25 NASA Railroad (Wilson Junction)

The Shuttle Landing Facility (SLF), also known as Launch and Landing Facility (LLF) (IATA: QQS, ICAO: KTTS, FAA LID: TTS), is an airport located on Merritt Island in Brevard County, Florida, United States. The facility opened in 1976 and operated under the FAA designation X68 until June 10, 1993, when the designation was changed to TTS. It is a part of the Kennedy Space Center and was used by Space Shuttle for landing until July 2011. It was also used for takeoffs and landings for NASA training jets such as the Shuttle Carrier Aircraft, Shuttle Training Aircraft, T-38 and for civilian aircraft.

Starting in 2015, Space Florida manages and operates the facility under a 30-year lease from NASA. In addition to ongoing use by NASA, private companies have been utilizing the SLF since the 2011 end of the Space Shuttle program.

== Facilities ==
The Shuttle Landing Facility covers 500 acres (2 km^{2}) and has a single runway, 15/33. It is one of the longest runways in the world, at 15,000 feet (4,572 m), and is 300 feet (91 m) wide. Despite its length, astronaut Jack R. Lousma stated that he would have preferred the runway to be "half as wide and twice as long". Additionally, the SLF has 1,001 feet (305 m) of paved overruns at each end. The Mate-Demate Device (MDD), for use when the Shuttle was transported by the Shuttle Carrier Aircraft, was located just off the southern end of the runway.

The runway is designated runway 15, or 33, depending on the direction of use. The runway surface consists of an extremely high-friction concrete strip designed to maximize the braking ability of the Space Shuttle at its high landing speed, with a paving thickness of 16.0 inches (40.6 cm) at the center. It uses a grooved design to provide drainage and further increase the coefficient of friction. The original groove design was found to actually provide too much friction for the rubber used in the Shuttle's tires, causing failures during several landings. This issue was resolved by grinding down the pavement, reducing the depth of the grooves significantly.

The first air traffic control tower for the SLF was built on top of the 100-foot-tall (30 m) MDD. This was replaced by a 1952-vintage portable 30-foot-tall (9.1 m) military field tower located near the center of the runway on the east bank. In September 2003, it was replaced by an 82-foot-tall (25 m) permanent tower, with a co-located weather observation station.

A local nickname for the runway is the "gator tanning facility", as some of the 4,000 alligators living at Kennedy Space Center regularly bask in the sunlight on the runway.

The landing facility is managed by contractor EG&G, which provides air traffic control services, as well as managing potential hazards to landing aircraft, such as bird life. The Bird Team kept the facility clear of both local and migratory birds during Shuttle landings using pyrotechnics, blank rounds fired from shotguns and a series of 25 propane cannons arranged around the facility.

== History and usage ==
=== Space Shuttle era ===
On April 14, 1972, NASA announced the selection of KSC as the launch and landing site for the Space Shuttle program. On December 10, 1973, KSC requested bids from 50 construction firms to build a 15,000-foot (4,572 m) runway to accommodate the Shuttle. On March 18, 1974, NASA awarded a US$21,812,737 (equivalent to $142,400,965 in 2025) contract to Morrison–Knudsen for the construction of the runway, including overruns, aprons, taxiways, and access roads. Construction of the runway began on April 1, 1974. The SLF officially opened in 1976 after receiving certification from the Federal Aviation Administration.

Columbia was the first Shuttle to arrive at the SLF via the Shuttle Carrier Aircraft on March 24, 1979.

The runway was first used to land a Space Shuttle on February 11, 1984, when Challenger's STS-41-B mission returned to Earth. This also marked the first landing of a spacecraft at its launch site. Prior to this, all Shuttle landings were performed at Edwards Air Force Base in California (with the exception of STS-3, which landed at White Sands Space Harbor) while the landing facility continued testing and Shuttle crews developed landing skills at White Sands and Edwards, where the margin for error is much greater than SLF and its water hazards. On September 22, 1993, Discovery was the first Space Shuttle to land at night at the SLF on STS-51. A total of 78 Space Shuttle missions landed at the SLF (58% of the 135 missions).

The final landing of a Space Shuttle occurred on July 21, 2011, by Atlantis for STS-135. Discovery and Endeavour took off from the SLF on top of the Shuttle Carrier Aircraft for museums in Washington, D.C., and Los Angeles.

=== Post-Shuttle use ===
In January 2014 it was announced that Boeing would lease the Orbiter Processing Facility at Kennedy Space Center to enable the U.S. Air Force to efficiently land, recover, refurbish, and re-launch the X-37B uncrewed spacecraft.

In October 2014, NASA signed agreement for the use of the facility, and Boeing upgraded the OPF-1 for the X-37B program.

The X-37B (OTV-4 mission) first used Runway 15 on May 7, 2017, at 11:47 UTC. Subsequently OTV-5 and 6 mission used Runway 33 for landing.

In 2012, NASA's Johnson Space Center's Project Morpheus's first vehicle arrived at KSC. Prior to arrival at KSC and throughout the project, Morpheus vehicle tests were performed at other NASA centers; KSC was the site for advanced testing. Multiple tests, including free flight, were performed at the SLF in 2013–2014. Multiple vehicles and iterations of the vehicles were tested, due to upgrades and damages during this experimental test program. During the August 9, 2012, test at the SLF, a vehicle exploded; no one was injured.

The SLF has also been used by commercial users. Zero Gravity Corporation, which offers flights where passengers experience brief periods of microgravity, has operated from the SLF, as have record-setting attempts by the Virgin Atlantic GlobalFlyer.

The SLF has been the site of high performance automobile testing and speed record attempts. In 2010, NASCAR teams used the facility for vehicle testing. In 2012, Performance Power's Johnny Bohmer drove his Ford GT modified test car at the SLF, setting the Guinness World Records mark for 'Fastest standing mile – car' with a record 283 mph (455 km/h), which still stands as of March 2023. Bohmer impressed the fact that the partnership agreement with NASA and the SLF to test the technology and designs and collect engineering data meant that "[B]y NASA allowing us access to a one-of-a-kind facility, we are given the opportunity to explore these technologies and share their benefits."

In 2014, in an attempt at an unofficial production car speed record at the SLF, a Hennessey Venom GT recorded a top speed of 270.49 mph (435.31 km/h). In 2021, in a similar attempt at the SLF, the SSC Tuatara recorded a one-way speed of 286.1 mph (460.4 km/h) and a two-way average of 282.9 mph (455.3 km/h).

In 2019, the Gulfstream G650ER of the multinational One More Orbit flight mission recorded the fastest circumnavigation of the Earth via the north and south poles of 46 h 40 min 22 s. The Shuttle Landing Facility served as launch and landing site for the world speed record, certified by the Guinness World Records and the World Air Sports Federation Fédération Aéronautique Internationale.

== Gallery ==
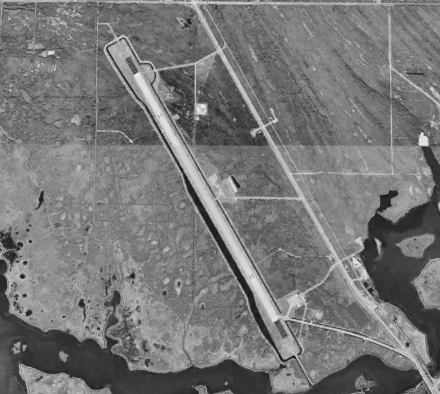
Aerial view of Shuttle Landing Facility in 1999

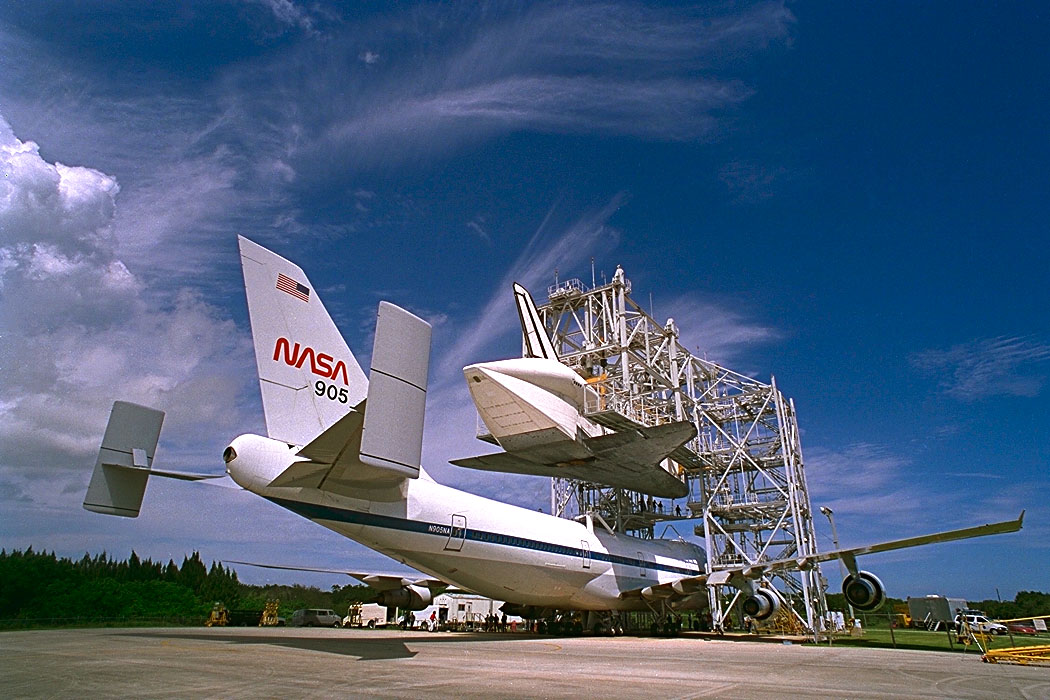
The Mate-Demate Device at the Shuttle Landing Facility

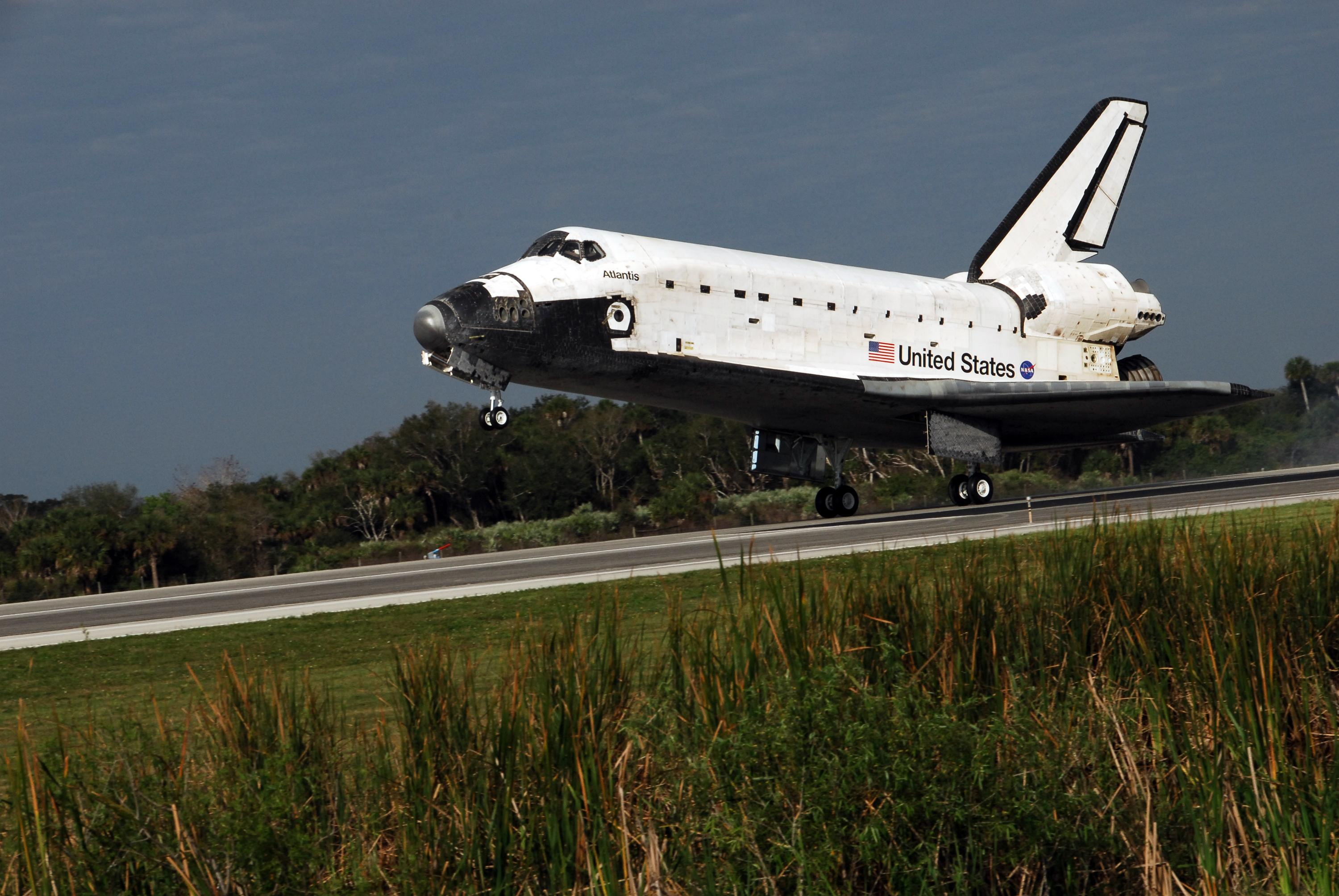
Space Shuttle Atlantis landing after STS-122, 2008

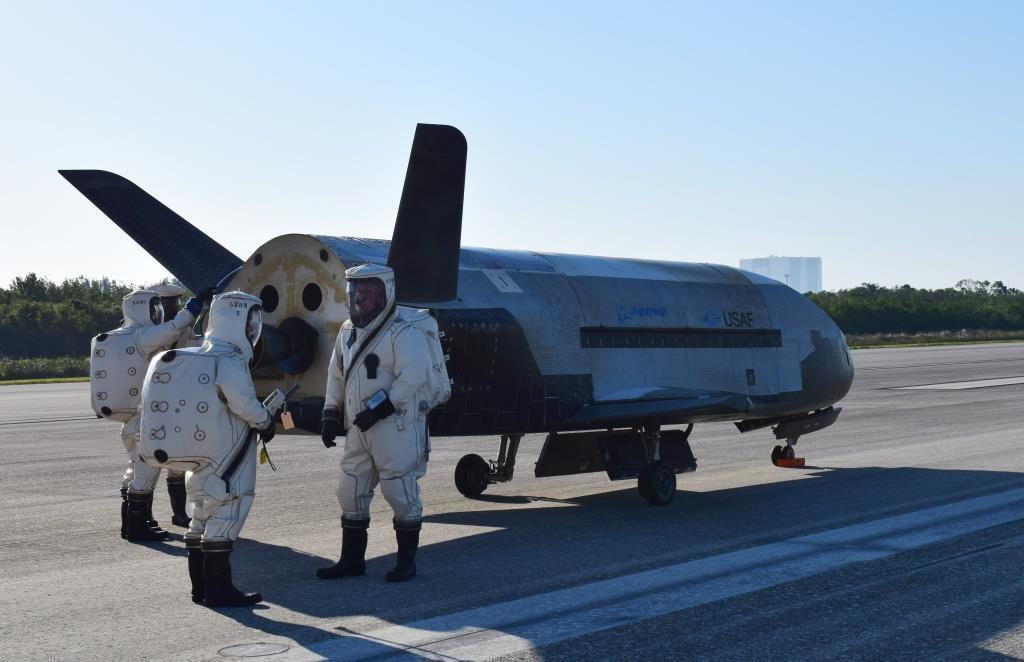
X-37B stationary after OTV-4, 2017

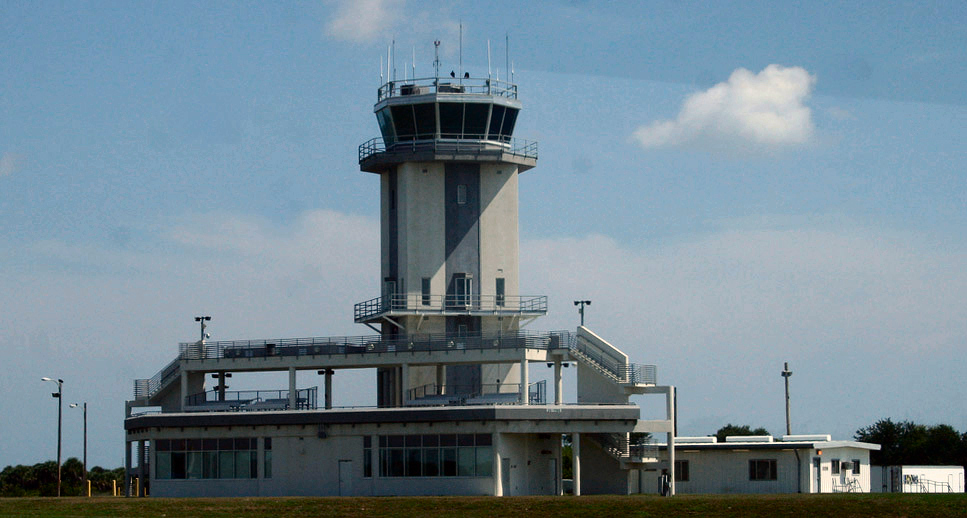
Air traffic control tower, opened in 2003

== See also ==
- Cape Canaveral Air Force Station Skid Strip
- List of Space Shuttle landing sites
