= Central Instrumentation Facility =

- Formerly listed on the U.S. National Register of Historic Places
- Former U.S. National Historic Landmark
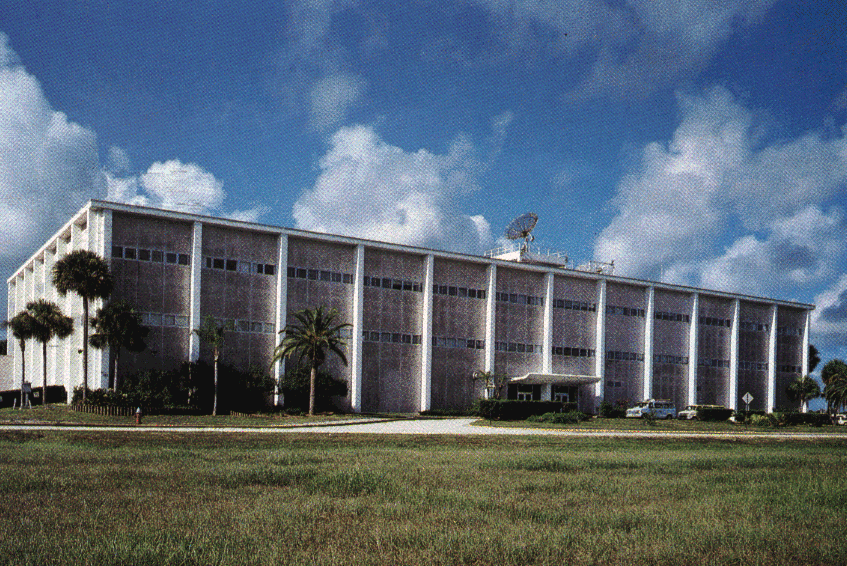

- Location within Florida Location within the United States
- Location: Brevard County, Florida, USA
- Nearest city: Titusville, Florida
- Coordinates: 28°31′27″N 80°39′22″W
- Built: 1965
- Architect: Charles Luckman
- Architectural style: International
- Visitation: n/a
- MPS: John F. Kennedy Space Center MPS
- NRHP reference No.: 99001635

Significant dates
- Added to NRHP: c. 1974
- Removed from NRHP: 21 January 2000

The Central Instrumentation Facility (CIF) was a building in the Kennedy Space Center industrial area that functioned as the core of instrumentation and data processing operations during the Apollo program and the early years of the Space Shuttle program. It centralized the handling of the center's data including offices, laboratories and test stations; and housed general instrumentation activities serving more than one launch complex. The CIF also included the Central Timing Facility, where a precision clock drove countdown clocks and other timing devices at KSC that required a high degree of accuracy.

The CIF also housed computers and other electronic equipment for reduction of telemetry data, analysis, and transmission to other NASA centers. The three-story structure of approximately 134,335 sq ft (12,480.1 m^{2}) just west of the KSC Headquarters Building was one of the most distinctive buildings in the KSC Industrial Area with its rooftop array of various antennas.

The CIF was left dormant during the intermediate part of the space shuttle program (as other facilities such as the launch control center managed most of the instrumentation in the 2000s), and fell into disrepair. In September 2017, all the equipment inside was donated to the visitor complex and storage facilities, while the disused building was eventually demolished in October.

== History ==
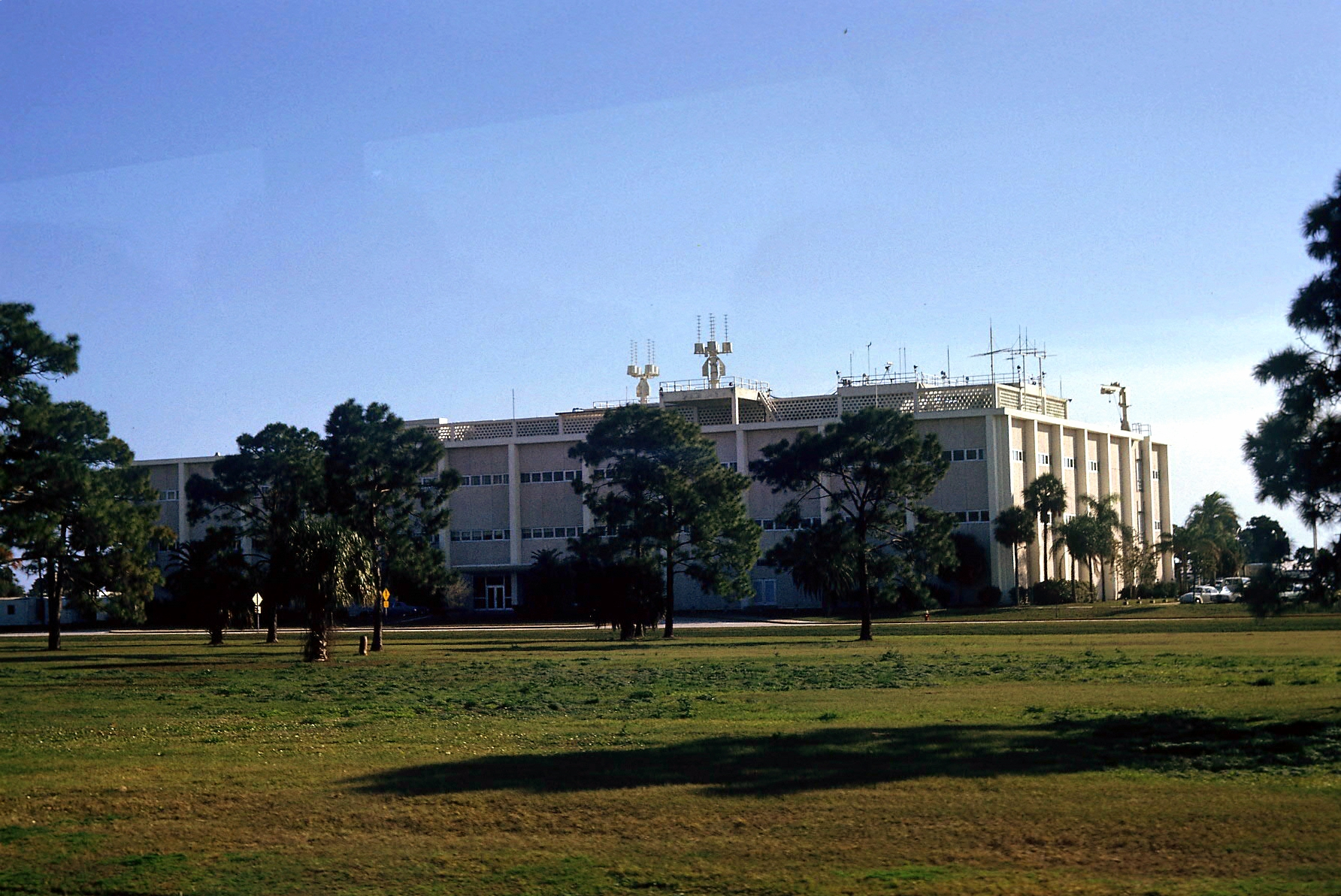
The CIF in 1974

The CIF reflected the desire of Karl Sendler, KSC's first director of information systems, and his planners to centralize data handling. Although it was based on systems developed during Saturn I operations at Complexes 34 and 37, such experience was of limited value, because the distance from Launch Complex 39 to its Launch Control Center was more than 14 times as long. Planning and construction were coordinated with other NASA centers and with the Atlantic Missile Range. All metal in the building was grounded, and commercial power and the instrumentation power systems were grounded separately. Fluorescent lights, a source of electromagnetic interference, were not permitted. Its architect, Charles Luckman, also designed other nearby buildings.

== CIF antenna site ==
A smaller building, later known as the CIF antenna site, was placed 1.5 miles (2.5 km) north of the Industrial Area, to be free of radio-frequency interference and have clear line-of-sight to the NASA launch complexes.
