= John F. Kennedy Space Center MPS =

- U.S. National Register of Historic Places
- Location within Florida Location within the United States
- Location: Titusville, Florida
- Coordinates: 28°35′6″N 80°39′3.6″W
- MPS: Historic Cultural Resources of the John F. Kennedy Space Center, Florida
- NRHP reference No.: 64500111

The following buildings were added to the National Register of Historic Places as part of the John F. Kennedy Space Center MPS Multiple Property Submission (or MPS). This is a partial list of historic places at KSC; full list available via KSC's Environmental Planning - Cultural Resources.

Resource Name	Also known as	Address	City	County	Added
Central Instrumentation Facility		John F. Kennedy Space Center	Titusville	Brevard County	January 21, 2000
Crawlerway		John F. Kennedy Space Center	Titusville	Brevard County	January 21, 2000
Headquarters Building		John F. Kennedy Space Center	Titusville	Brevard County	December 1, 2000
Launch Complex 39		John F. Kennedy Space Center	Titusville	Brevard County	May 24, 1973
Launch Complex 39-Pad A		John F. Kennedy Space Center	Titusville	Brevard County	January 21, 2000
Launch Complex 39-Pad B		John F. Kennedy Space Center	Titusville	Brevard County	January 21, 2000
Launch Control Center		John F. Kennedy Space Center	Titusville	Brevard County	January 21, 2000
Missile Crawler Transporter Facilities		John F. Kennedy Space Center	Titusville	Brevard County	January 21, 2000
Operations and Checkout Building		John F. Kennedy Space Center	Titusville	Brevard County	January 21, 2000
Press Site-Clock and Flag Pole		John F. Kennedy Space Center	Titusville	Brevard County	January 21, 2000
Vehicle Assembly Building-High Bay and Low Bay		John F. Kennedy Space Center	Titusville	Brevard County	January 21, 2000

== See also ==
- National Register of Historic Places listings in Brevard County, Florida
