= Orbiter Processing Facility =

Hangars formerly used for Space Shuttle maintenance at NASA's Kennedy Space Center

- Part of Launch Complex 39
- United States
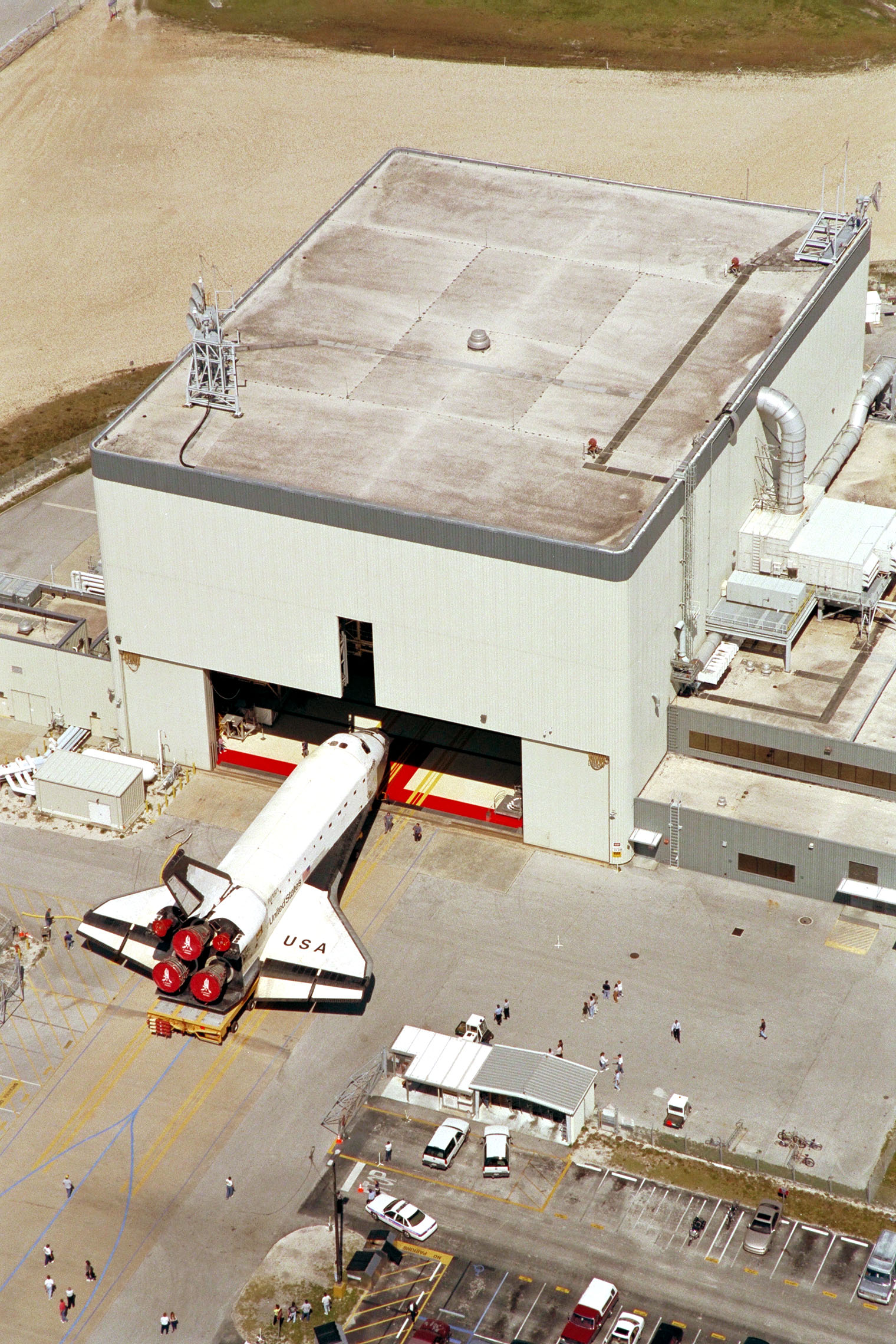
- Space Shuttle Columbia at the entrance of Orbiter Processing Facility 3

Site information
- Type: Facility
- Operator: NASA (1981–2012); Boeing (2014–present)
- Website: http://science.ksc.nasa.gov/facilities/opf.html

Location
- Coordinates: 28.585803°N 80.654991°W
- Height: 29 m (95 ft)
- Length: 121 m (397 ft)

Orbiter Processing Facility (OPF) is a class of hangars where U.S. Space Shuttle orbiters underwent maintenance between flights. They are located west of the Vehicle Assembly Building, where the orbiter was mated with its external tank and Solid Rocket Boosters before transport to the launch pad. OPF-1 and OPF-2 are connected with a low bay between them, while OPF-3 is across the street.

OPF-3 was previously called the Orbiter Maintenance & Refurbishment Facility (OMRF), but was upgraded to a fully functioning OPF.

== Processing flow ==
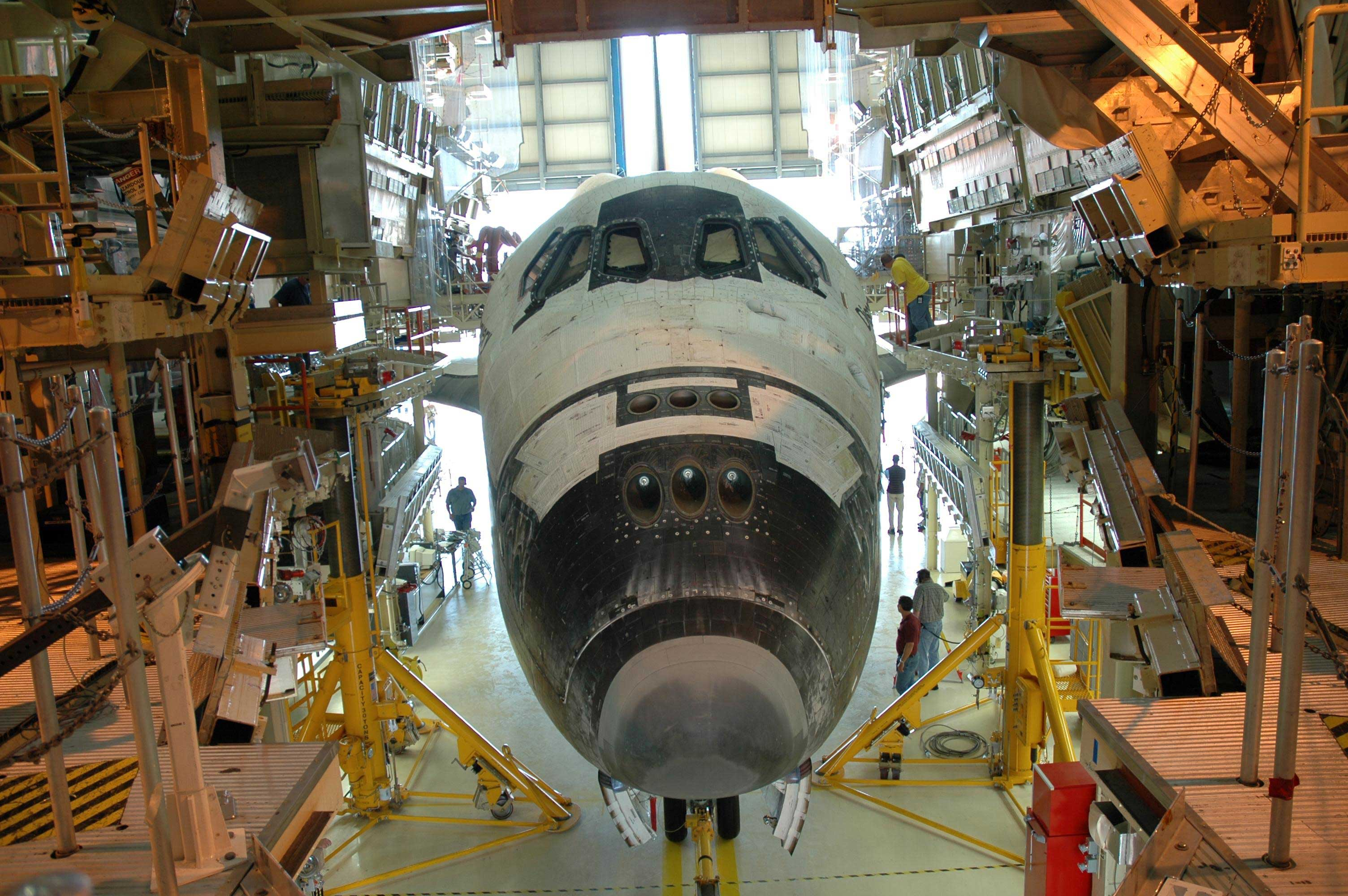
Discovery inside OPF-3 following the completion of mission STS-114

When a Shuttle mission was completed, the orbiter was towed from the Shuttle Landing Facility to its assigned OPF where it spent several months (typically less than 100 days) being prepared for the next mission. Any remaining payloads from the previous mission were removed and the vehicle was fully inspected, tested, and refurbished.

- The orbiter's main engines were purged to remove the moisture that was a by-product of liquid oxygen and liquid hydrogen combustion.
- payload bay doors were opened and any hazardous payloads were processed for safety
- fuel cell tanks were drained of remaining cryogenic reactants. The oxygen system was rendered inert with gaseous nitrogen and the hydrogen system with gaseous helium.
- high-pressure gases were vented from the environmental control and life support systems.
- refuse and other waste products including draining of the potable water system were offloaded
- heat shields were removed from the engines and aft access were opened
- main engines were locked in place and covers installed.
- scaffolding was installed around the orbiters aft to allow technicians to access the main engines
- main engines were removed and transferred to the Main Engine Processing Facility for checkout and service
- any needed repairs on the orbiter's thermal protection system including the thermal blankets and the silica tiles were completed.
- the Orbital Maneuvering System and Reaction Control System pods were possibly removed and transferred to the Hypergol Maintenance Facility for troubleshooting, repair or other services.
- any modifications to the orbiter were completed in the OPF.
- After all its flights, the orbiter went through "Down Mission Processing."

Prior to rollout to the Vehicle Assembly Building, several weeks before scheduled launch, the orbiter was prepared for the next mission by installing mission flight kits, payloads, consumable fluids and gases where possible. Remaining payloads, fuels and fluids were installed on the pad closer to launch day. The last step before rollover to the VAB was weighing the orbiter to determine its center of gravity.

== Current status ==
OPF-1 was closed following Atlantis's rollout on June 29, 2012, and OPF-2 was closed following its departure on October 18, 2012. OPF-3 is under lease to Boeing for the manufacture and testing of their CST-100 Starliner spacecraft.

On 8 October 2014, NASA confirmed that Boeing X-37B vehicles would be housed at Kennedy Space Center in OPF-1 and 2, hangars previously occupied by the Space Shuttle. Boeing had said the space planes would use OPF-1 in January 2014, and the Air Force had previously said it was considering consolidating X-37B operations, housed at Vandenberg Air Force Base in California, nearer to their launch site at Cape Canaveral. NASA also stated that the program had completed tests to determine whether the X-37B, one-fourth the size of the Space Shuttle, could land on the former Shuttle runways. NASA furthermore stated that renovations of the two hangars would be completed by the end of 2014; the main doors of OPF-1 were marked with the message "Home of the X-37B" by this point.
