= Operations and Checkout Building =

Historic American spaceflight facility in Cape Canaveral, Florida

- U.S. National Register of Historic Places
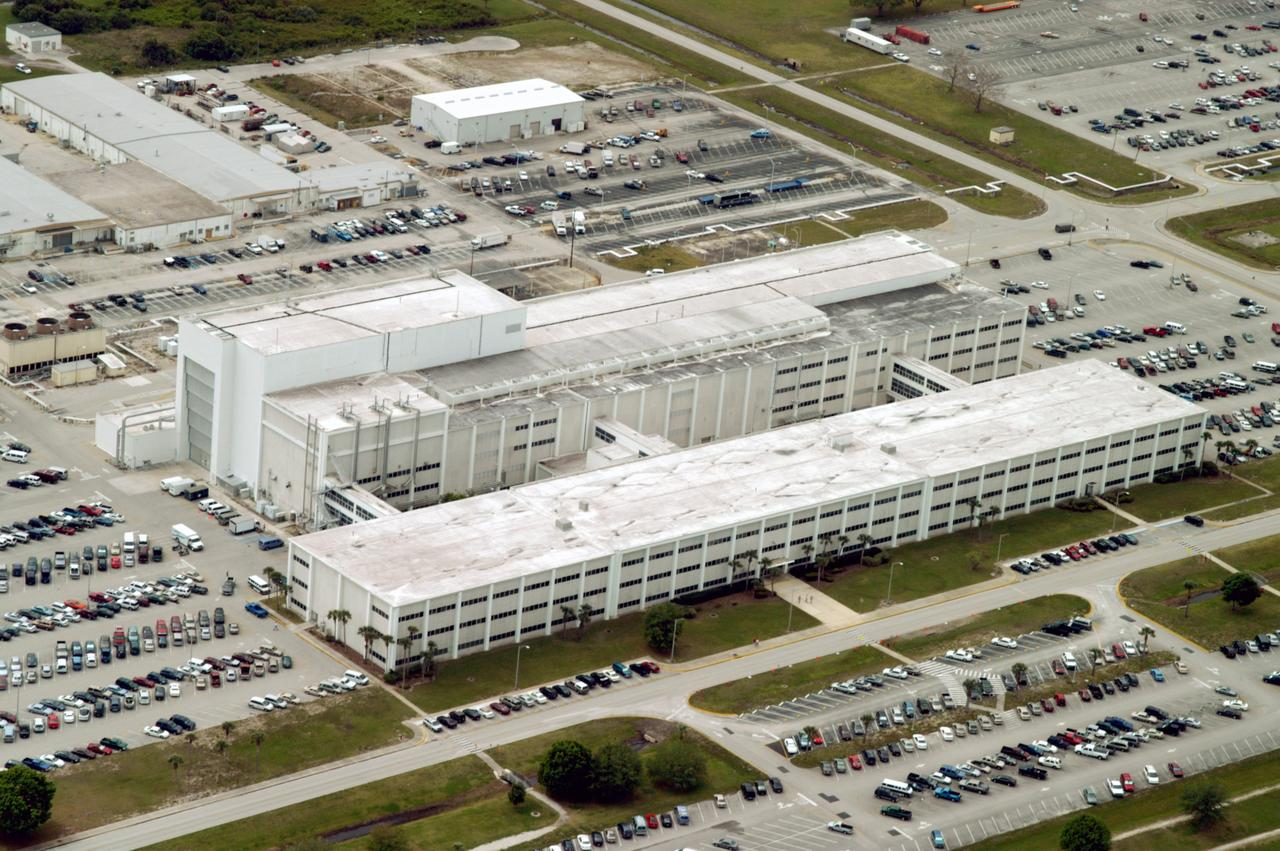
- Aerial view of the Operations and Checkout building at KSC, c. 2017

- Location within Florida Location within the United States
- Location: Brevard County, Florida, USA
- Nearest city: Titusville, Florida
- Coordinates: 28°31′26″N 80°38′46″W
- Built: 1964
- Architect: Charles Luckman
- Architectural style: International
- Visitation: Open, requires sponsorship by NASA employee
- MPS: John F. Kennedy Space Center MPS
- NRHP reference No.: 99001636
- Added to NRHP: January 21, 2000

The Neil Armstrong Operations and Checkout Building (O&C) (previously known as the Manned Spacecraft Operations Building) is a historic building on Merritt Island, Florida, United States. The five-story structure is in the Industrial Area of NASA's Kennedy Space Center. It has twin-block facilities that include the crew quarter dormitories for astronauts, suit-up preparations prior to their flights, and the other is a large spacecraft workshop used for manufacturing and checking activities on crewed spacecraft. On January 21, 2000, it was added to the U.S. National Register of Historic Places.

== Apollo program ==
During planning and construction, it was known as the Operations and Checkout Building. When it was finished in 1964, it was renamed the Manned Spacecraft Operations Building and was used to process spacecraft in the Gemini and Apollo era. It was reverted back to the Operations and Checkout Building during the Shuttle program, known informally as the O&C.

=== Altitude test chambers ===
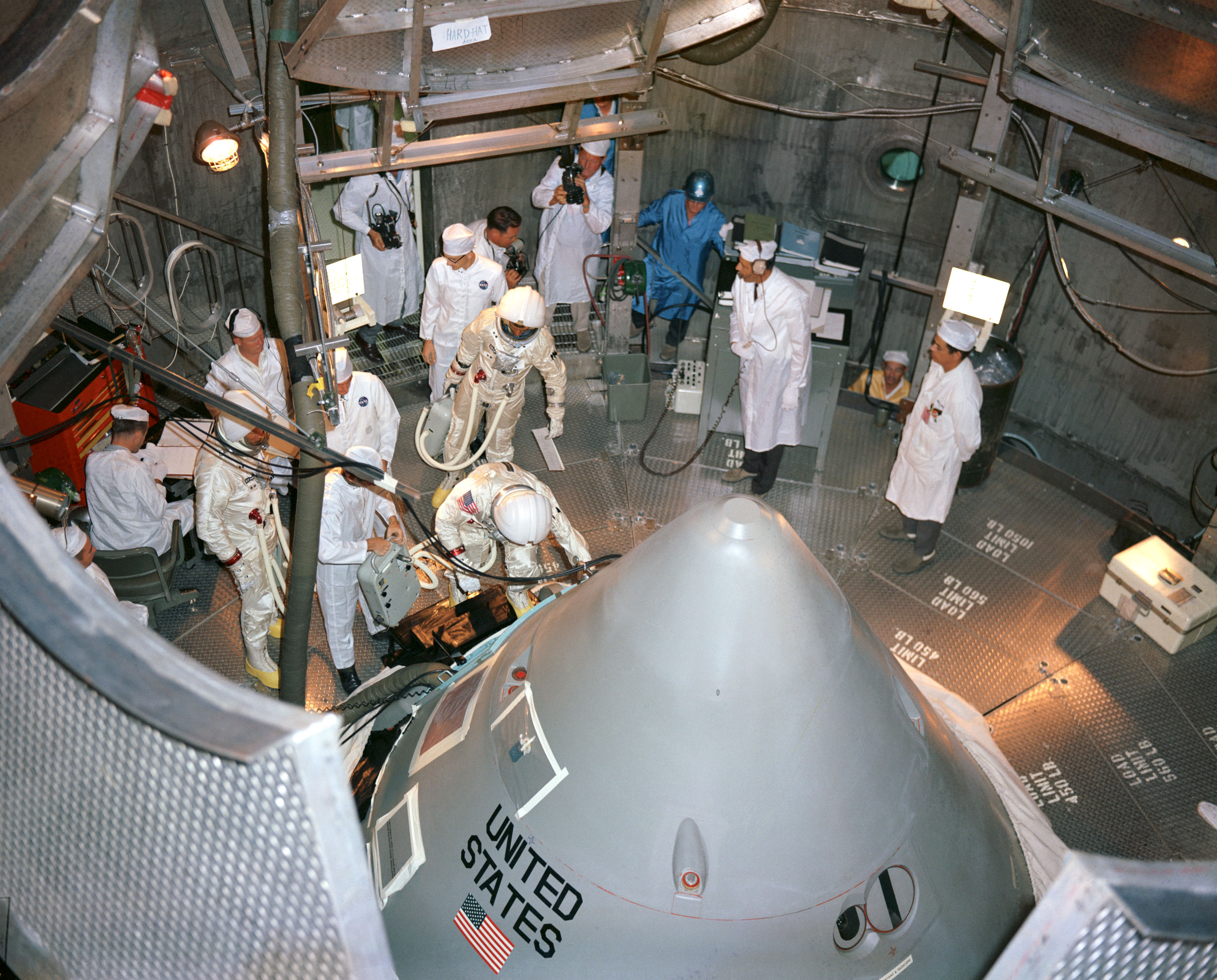
The Apollo 1 crew, Gus Grissom, Ed White and Roger Chaffee, enter their spacecraft for a test in the O&C altitude chamber on October 18, 1966.

In 1965, a pair of altitude chambers were installed in the High Bay for testing the environmental and life support systems of both the Apollo Command/Service Module and Lunar Module at simulated altitudes of up to 250,000 feet (76 km). Each chamber is 58 feet (18 m) high (with a clear working height of 28 feet (8.5 m)) and an interior diameter of 33 feet (10 m), were human-rated, and capable of reaching the maximum altitude (minimum pressure) in one hour. These were used by the prime and backup crews of all crewed missions, from the ill-fated Apollo 1 in October 1966, through to the Apollo-Soyuz Test Project in July 1975.

== Post-Apollo use ==
During the 1980s and 90s the O&C building was used to house and test Spacelab science modules before their flights aboard the Space Shuttle.

In the late 1990s and 2000s, some modules and trusses for the International Space Station were checked out in the building.

== Artemis Program ==
On January 30, 2007, NASA held a ceremony to mark the transition of the building's high bay for use by the Constellation program. The building would serve as the final assembly facility for the Orion crew exploration vehicle. In preparation for the transition, the state of Florida provided funds to clear the facility of about 50 short tons (45 metric tons) of steel stands, structures and equipment. Renovations totaling $55 million took place from June 2007 through January 2009, at which point Lockheed Martin became the operator of the facility for Orion production. The Orion spacecraft for Artemis I completed its assembly in this location and was moved to the Multi-Payload Processing Facility on January 16, 2021. The building was also used for final testing of the Orion spacecraft for the Artemis II mission.

The building was renamed to the Neil Armstrong Operations and Checkout Building in a ceremony on the 45th anniversary of Apollo 11 (2014).

== Gallery ==
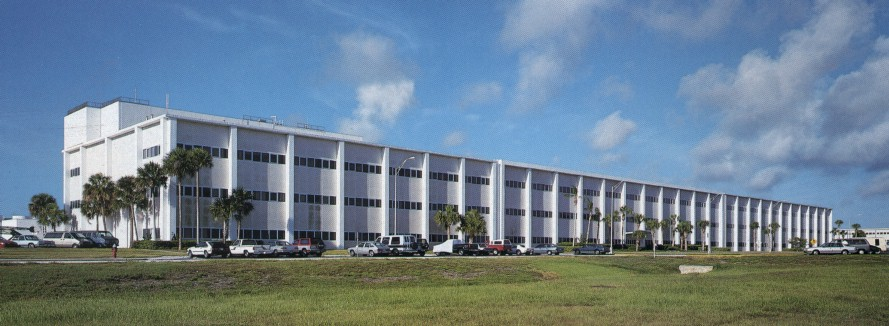
The O&C in 1984

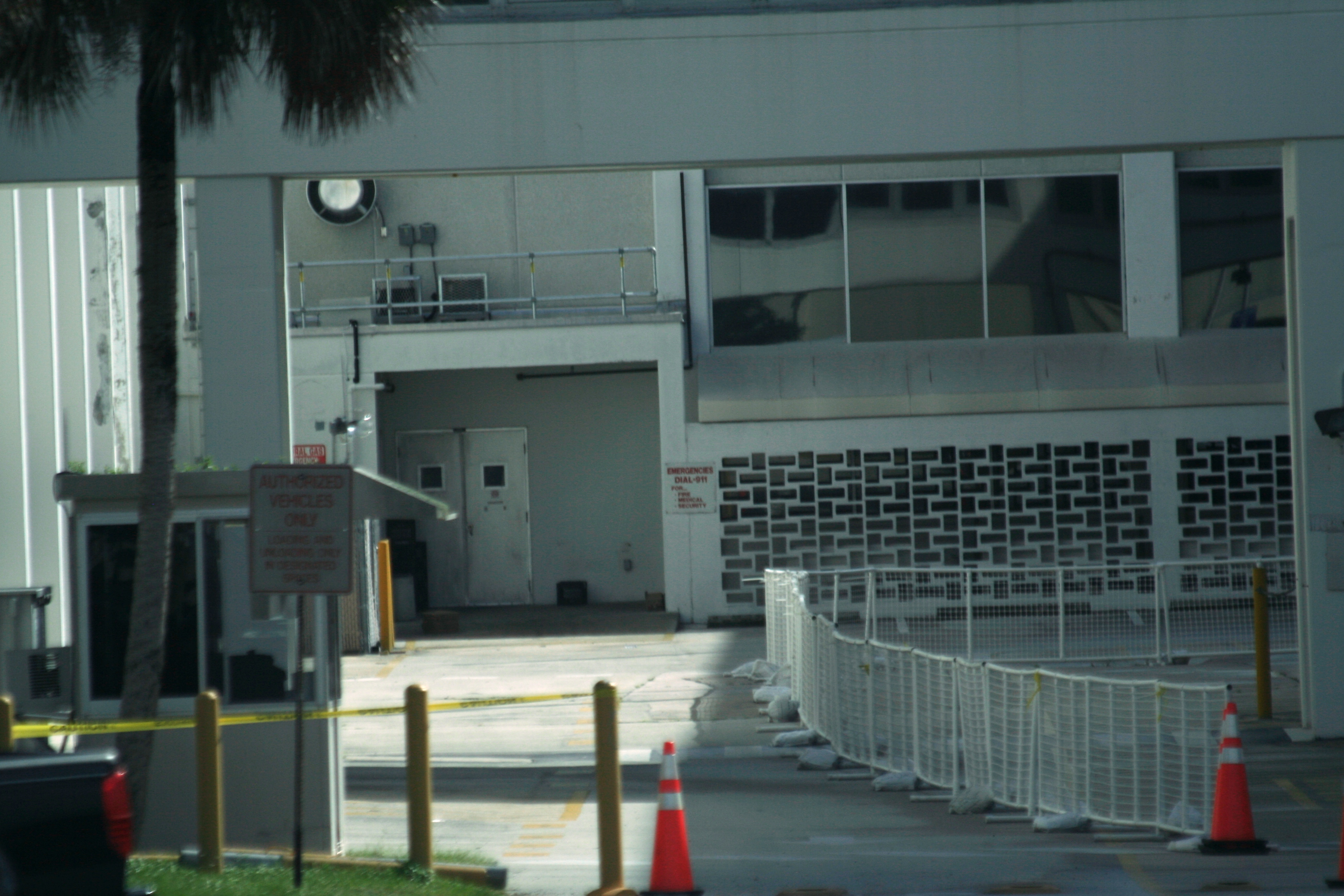
Exit door from Operations and Checkout Building connector. A nearby doorway on the adjacent north wall of the rear building is where astronauts would board the Astrovan for transport to Launch Complex 39.

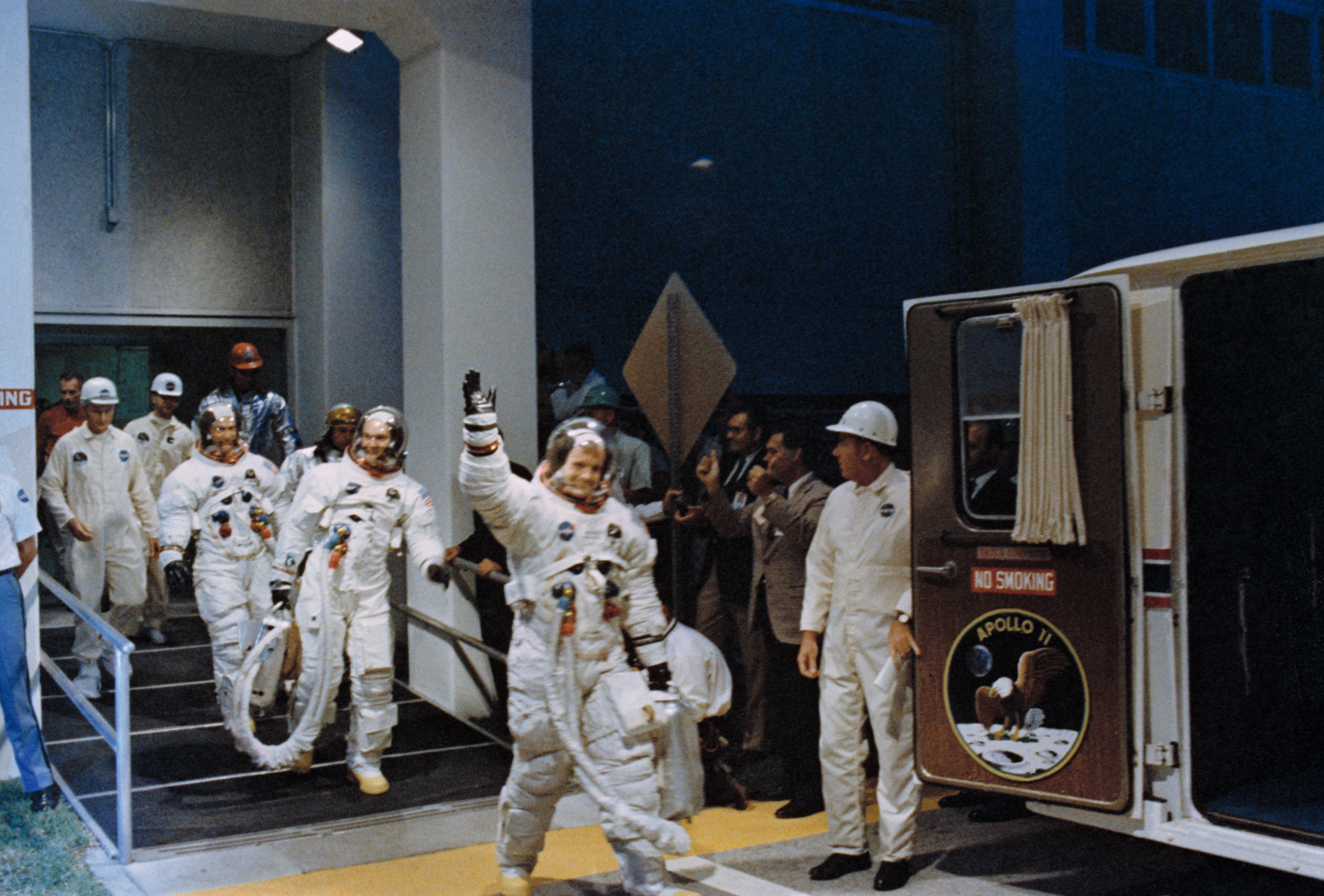
Apollo 11 crew members Neil Armstrong, Michael Collins, and Buzz Aldrin on the morning of July 16, 1969

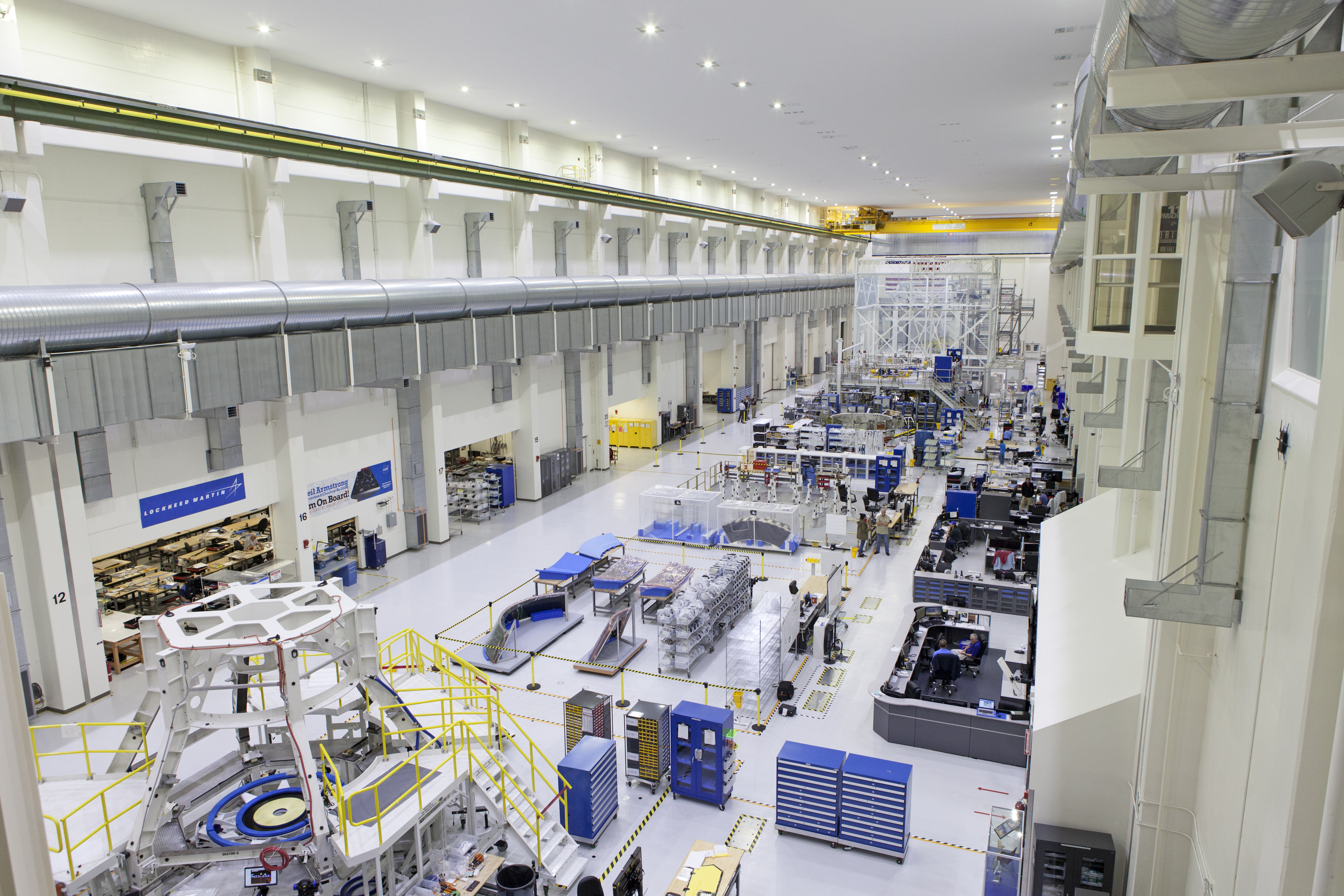
The spacecraft workshop number 1

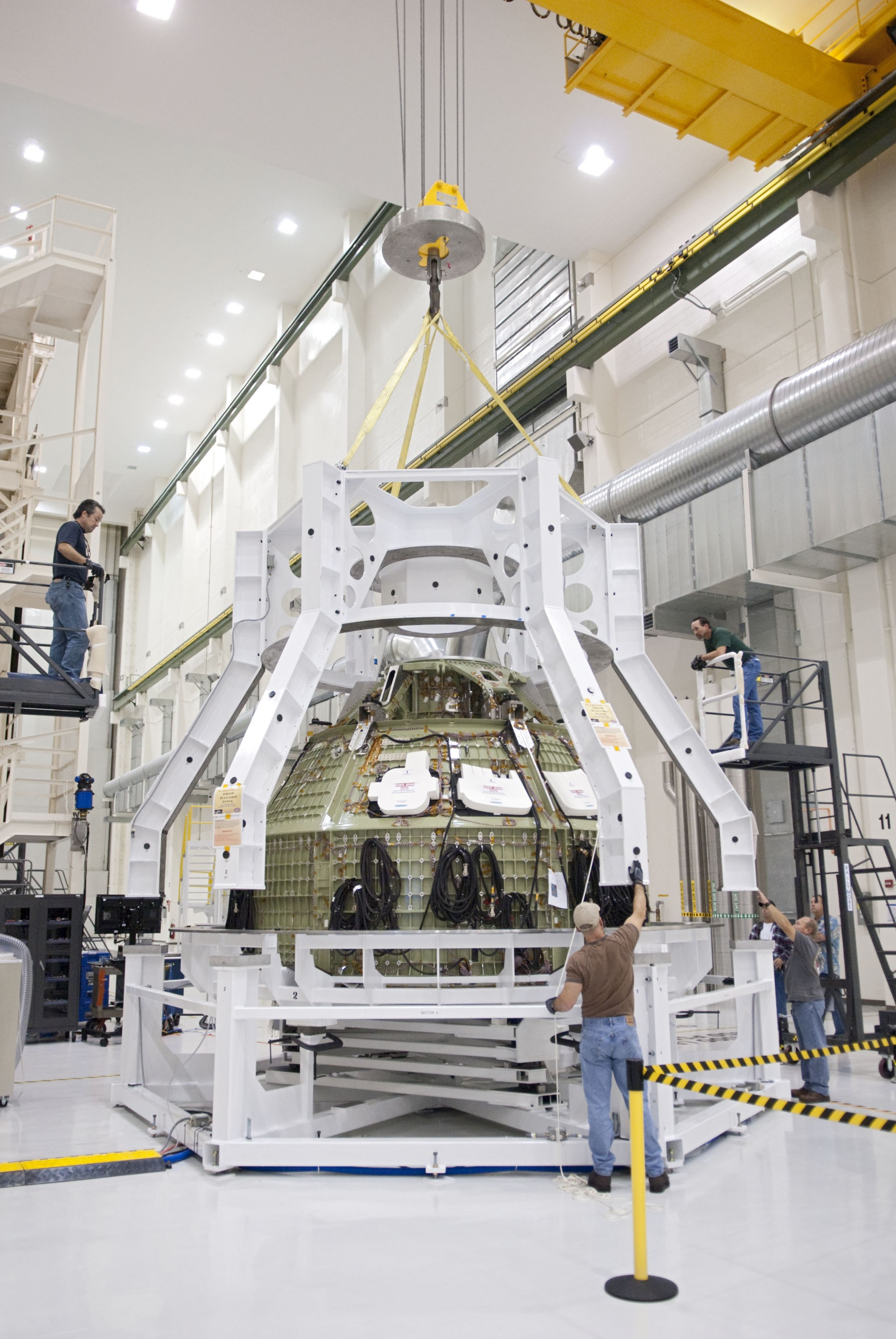
Orion Spacecraft in the workshop of the Operations and Checkout Building

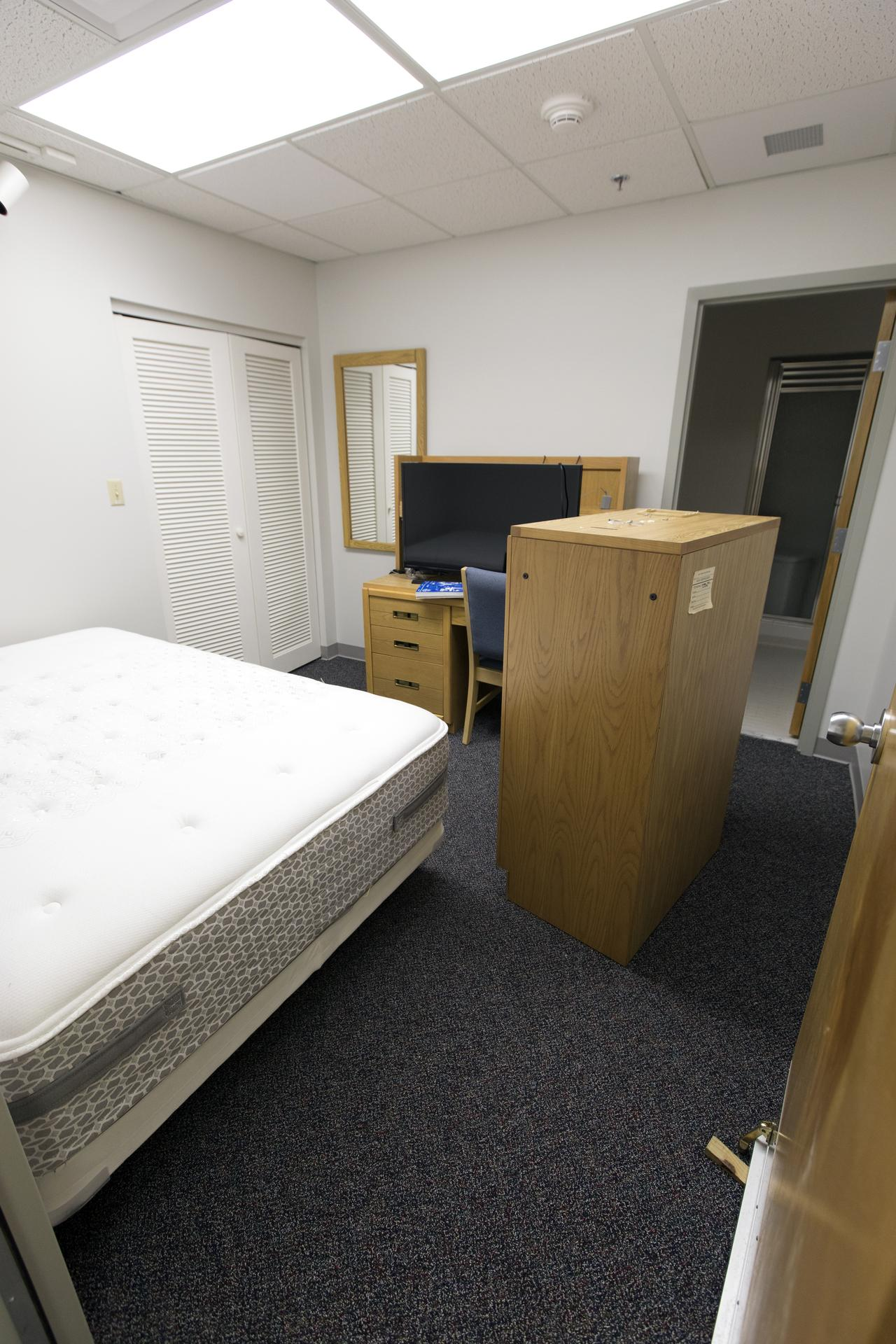
Astronauts sleep prior to launch day in dormitories in the Operations and Checkout Building. In this case a bedroom is undergoing renovations.

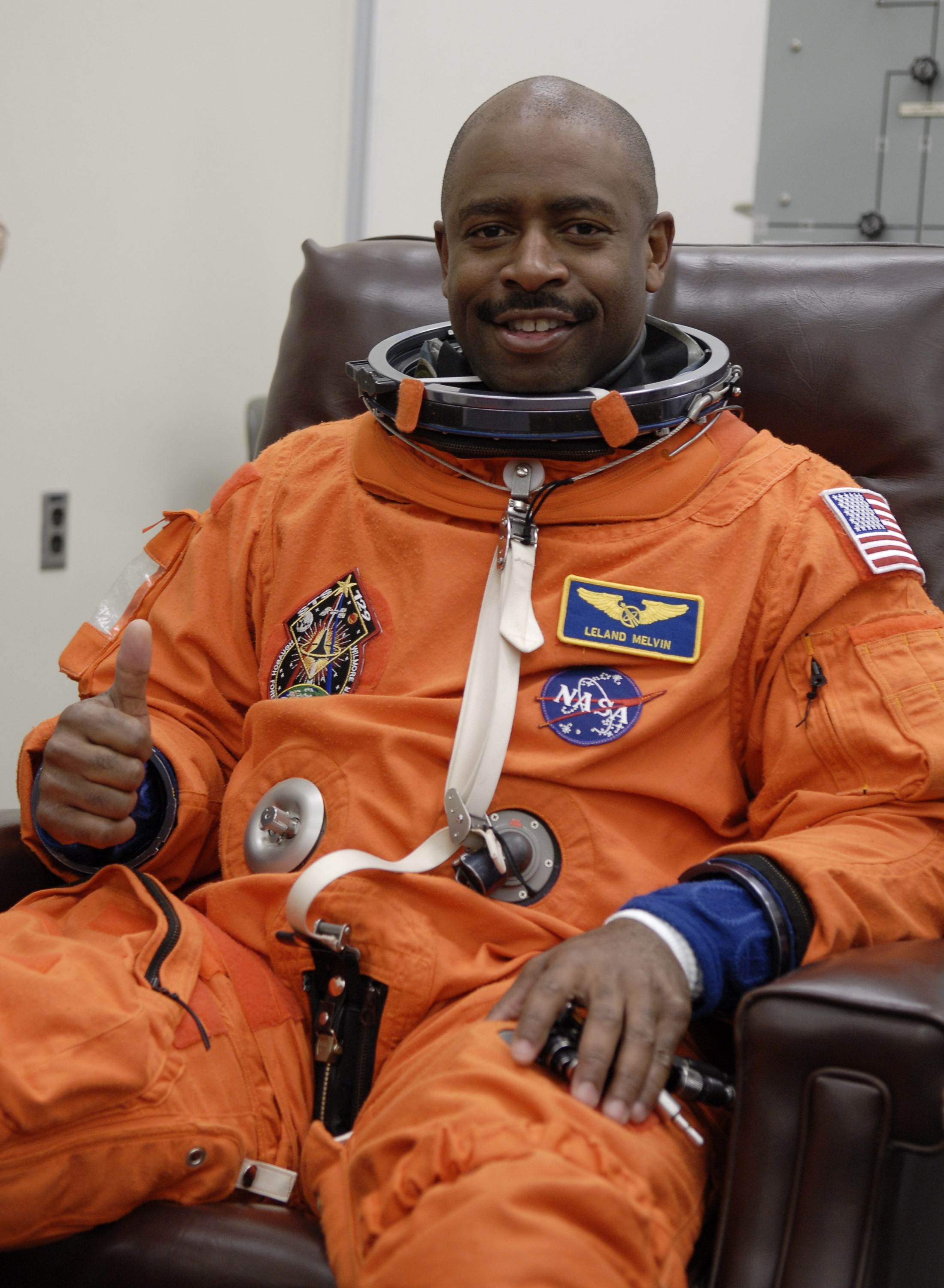
Astronauts have suit-up flight preparations in the building.
