= Astronaut Beach House =

House in Florida, United States

Kennedy Space Center Conference Center
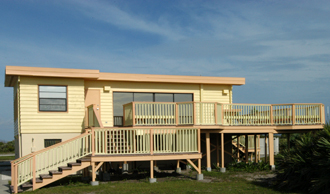
- The Beach House in 2010 after painting and refurnishing
- Interactive map of the Kennedy Space Center Conference Center area
- Former names: Astronaut Training and Rehabilitation Building
- Alternative names: Astronaut Beach House

General information
- Location: John F. Kennedy Space Center, Brevard County, Florida, United States
- Coordinates: 28°34′27″N 80°34′19″W
- Completed: 1962
- Owner: NASA

Technical details
- Floor count: 2

The Astronaut Beach House is a two-story house built in 1962 as a part of the then Neptune Beach subdivision at Cape Canaveral, Florida.

NASA purchased the development through eminent domain for $31,500 in 1963 to accommodate the expanding Kennedy Space Center, and other private homes were removed. Unlike a nearby gas station and store, the home was left and has served as a social gathering point for astronauts prior to launch. Officially it was called the Astronaut Training and Rehabilitation Building then, today it is officially titled the Kennedy Space Center Conference Center. Throughout its history with NASA it has been known as the Astronaut Beach House or simply The Beach House.

It stands 50 meters (160 ft) back from the shoreline directly in between Pads 40 and 41. It also serves as a private conference center, and for astronauts and their families for private gatherings and barbecues before launch. The house contains memorabilia including wine bottles signed by crew members identified by mission decals.

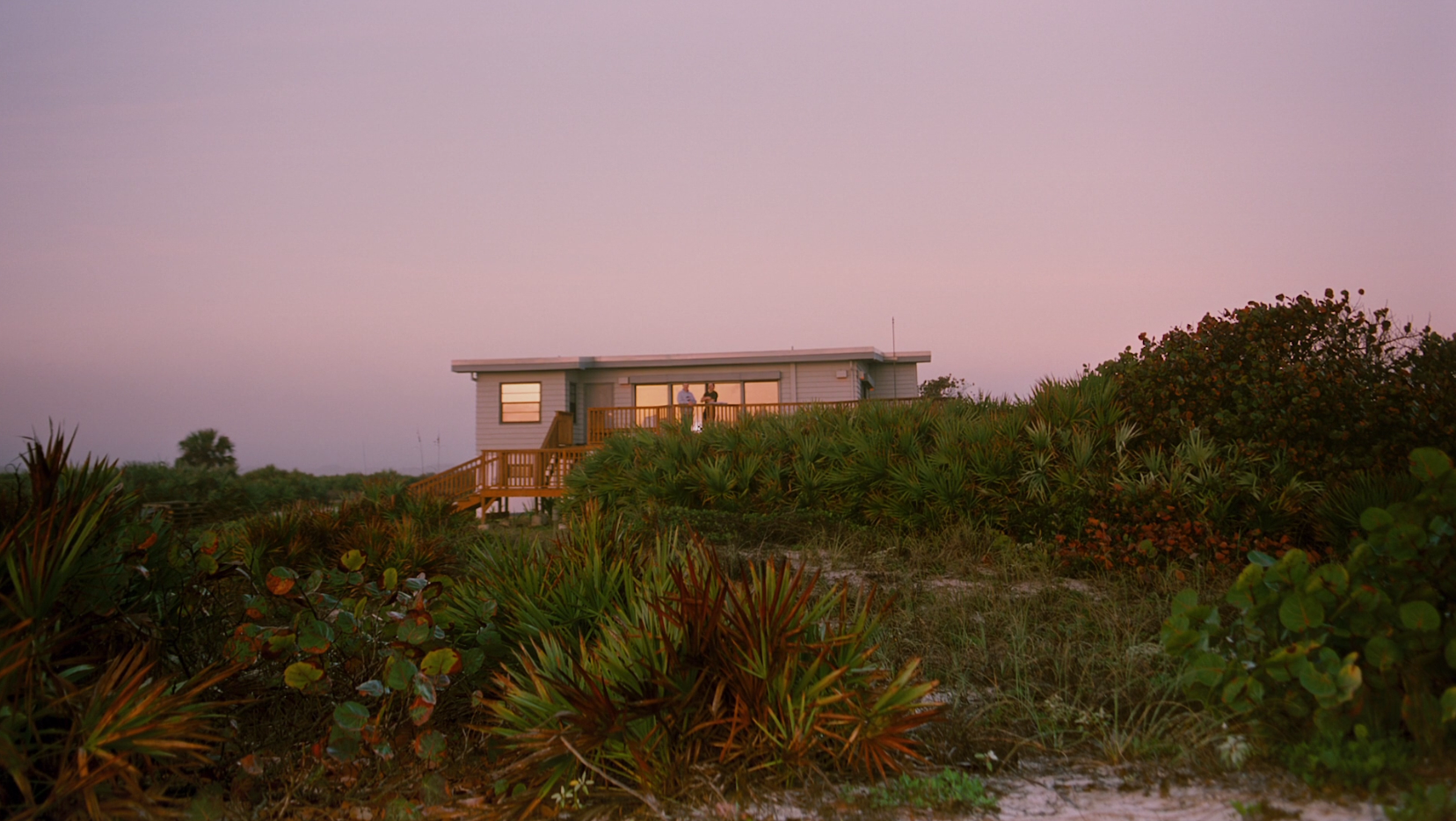
Astronaut Beach House near Pad 40/41

== See also ==
- Kennedy Space Center
