= Launch Complex 39 Press Site =

- LC-39 Press Site–Clock and Flag Pole
- U.S. National Register of Historic Places
- U.S. National Historic Site
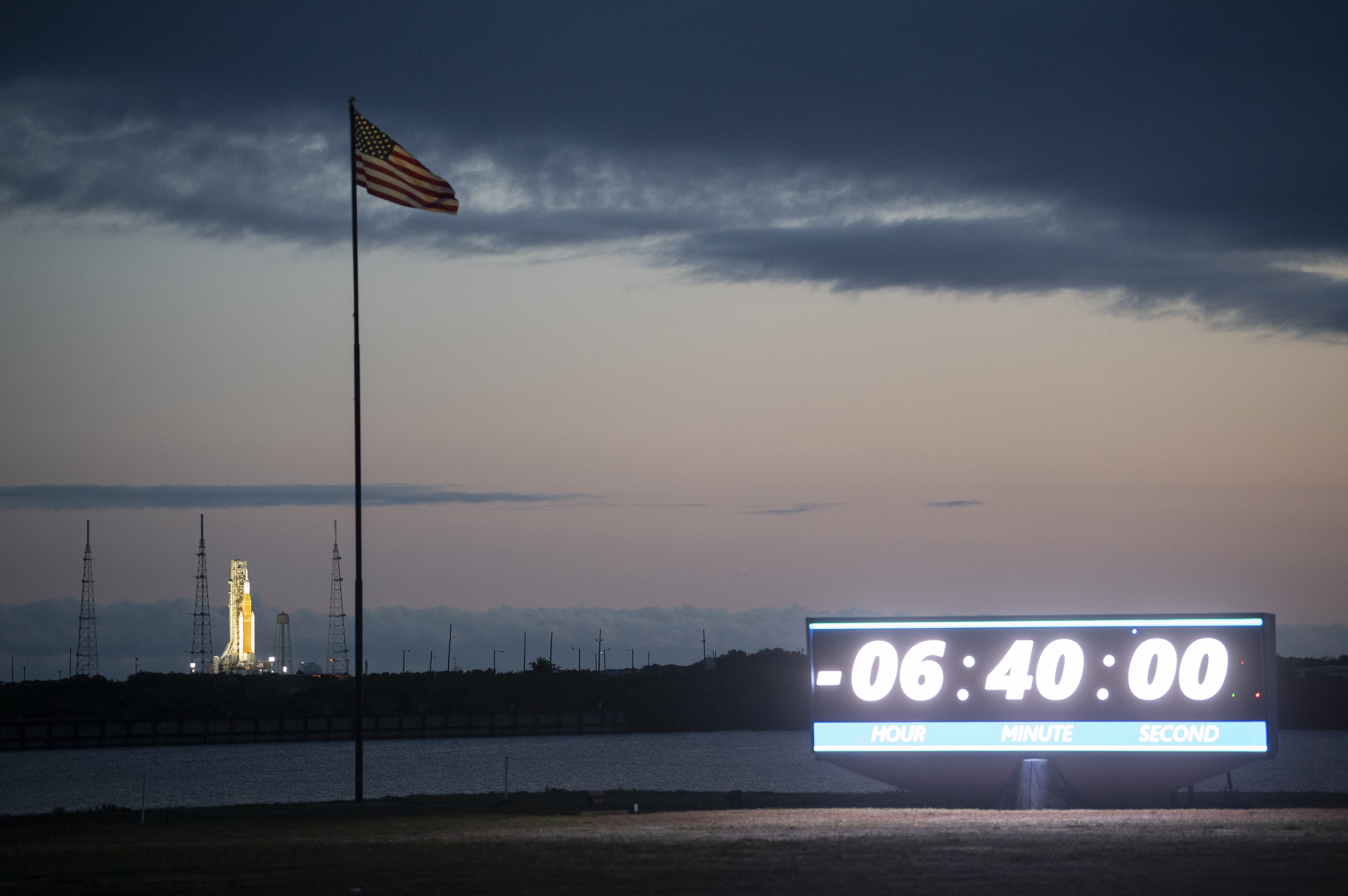
- The flagpole and countdown clock at sunrise during the Artemis 1 wet dress rehearsal on April 3, 2022
- Location: Kennedy Space Center; Merritt Island, Florida
- Nearest city: Titusville, Florida
- Coordinates: 28°34′56.95″N 80°38′42.39″W
- Built: 1967
- Visitation: not open to the public (n/a)
- MPS: John F. Kennedy Space Center MPS
- NRHP reference No.: 99001637
- Added to NRHP: January 21, 2000

The Launch Complex 39 Press Site is a news media facility at Launch Complex 39 at the John F. Kennedy Space Center (KSC) on Merritt Island, Florida where journalists have observed every U.S. crewed space launch since Apollo 8 in 1968. The site is just south of the Vehicle Assembly Building (VAB); 3 miles (4.8 km) west-southwest of Pad A, and 3.4 miles (5.4 km) southwest of Pad B.

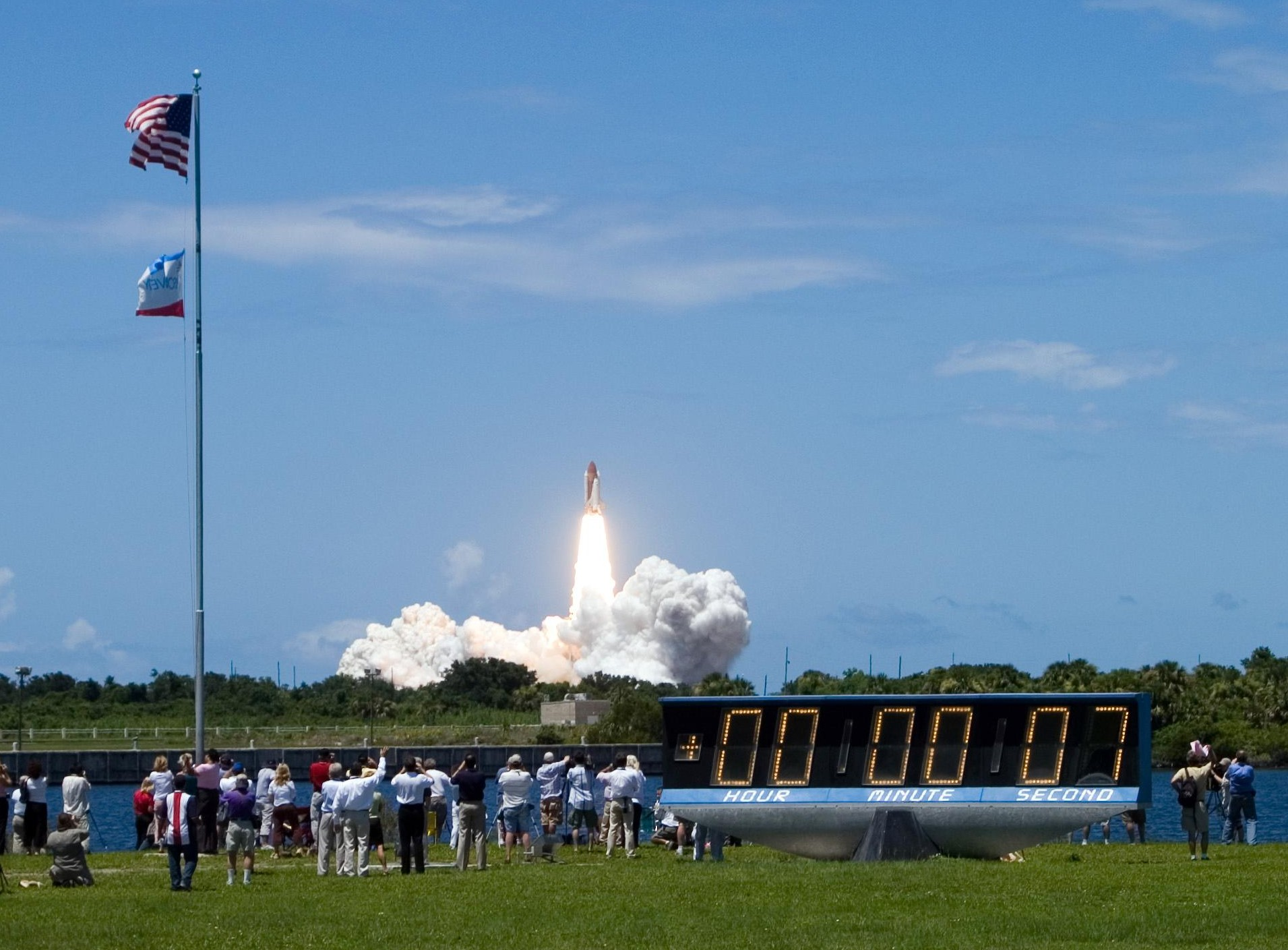
The STS-121 launch seen from the LC-39 Press Site in July 2006

The site includes an elevated mound where news media facilities are located, as well as the KSC News Center and several smaller support buildings. The News Center is 8,700 square feet (810 m^{2}) and contains 15 site support offices, media workspace, and a media library. Current media buildings include CBS, NBC, Florida Today and The Orlando Sentinel; and trailers for The Associated Press and Reuters.

The 100-seat auditorium in the audio-video support building, where pre- and post-launch news conferences are held, is named for former CNN correspondent John Holliman, who covered space exploration until his death in 1998. It was built in 1980.

A large illuminated digital countdown clock and a flagpole flying an American flag on the edge of the turning basin have often been included in television coverage and launch photos. Before a launch, the clock counts down, showing the remaining time until T-zero in hours, minutes and seconds (–00:00:00). After launch, the clock counts forward in Mission Elapsed Time for several hours. The flagpole also flew a smaller Space Shuttle Orbiter-specific flag below the American flag on launch day during the final years of the Space Shuttle Program.

== History ==
The site was ready for coverage of the first launch from KSC, the uncrewed Apollo 4 flight on November 9, 1967, for which NASA received 510 requests for news media accreditation. The sound of this first Saturn V liftoff was sufficiently powerful at the Press Site to prompt CBS-TV anchor Walter Cronkite to exclaim, "Our building's shaking here...the floor is shaking...this big glass window is shaking, we're holding it with our hands!" A ceiling tile or two were shaken loose above his head.

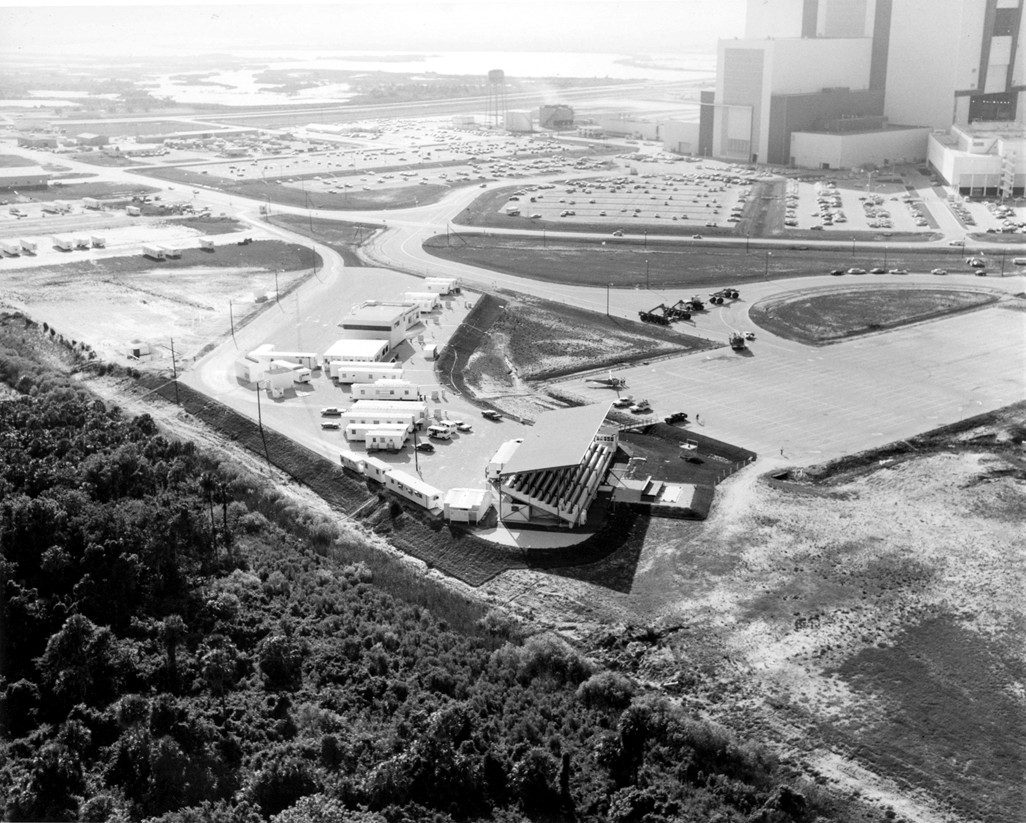
Aerial view of the Press Site in May 1969 looking north with the VAB at upper right

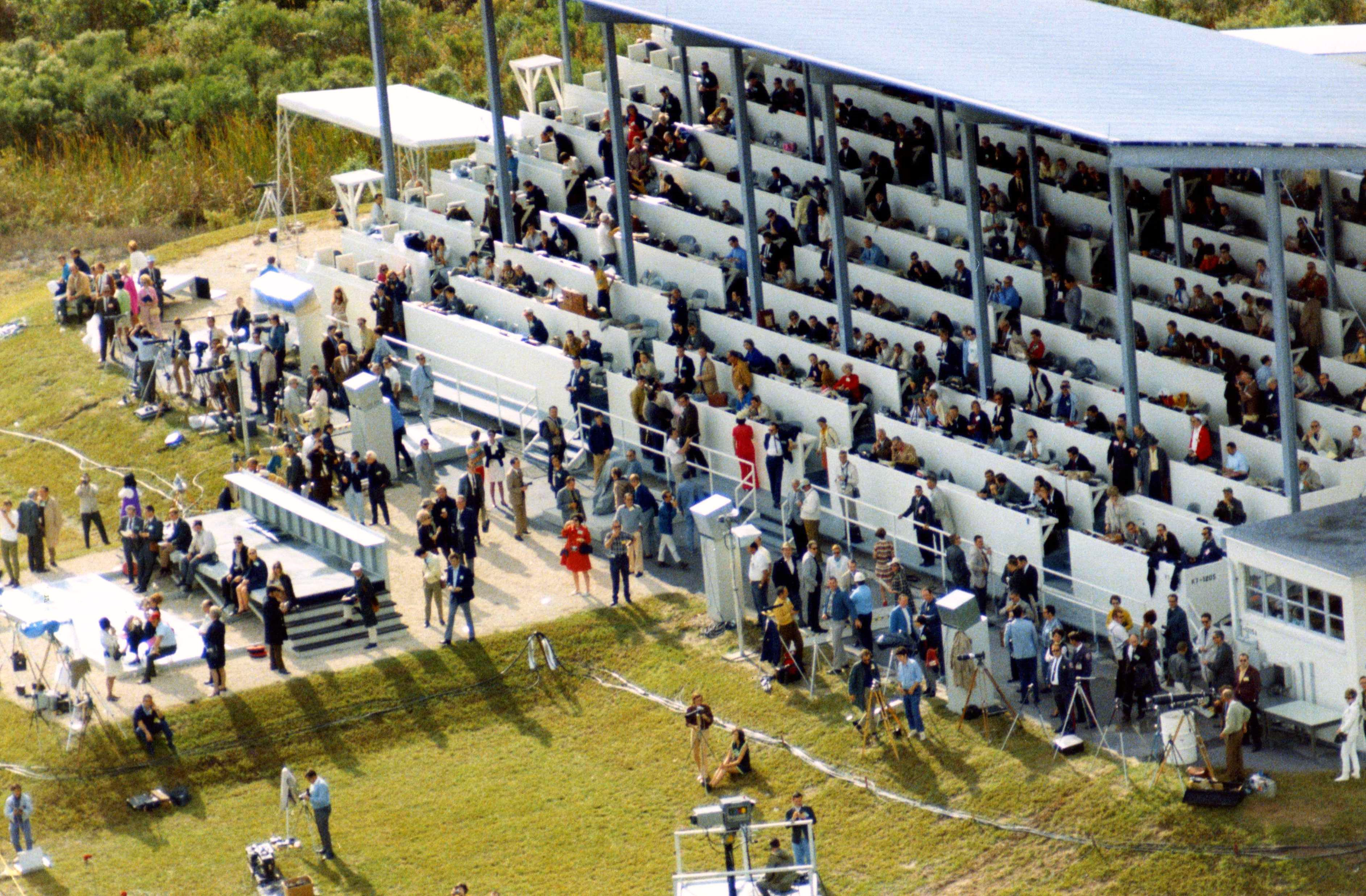
The grandstand before the Apollo 12 launch in November 1969

During the Apollo program, the NASA news center was located in Cocoa Beach. To provide on-site public affairs offices, a Charter-Sphere dome from the Third Century America exhibition near the VAB during the United States Bicentennial in 1976 was later moved to the mound. In 1983, it was replaced by a larger dome; and a permanent building, the current KSC News Center, replaced that dome in December 1995.

During the first decade of Space Shuttle launches, NASA contractors provided reference materials to the media from the Joint Industry Press Center (JIPC, pronounced "gypsy"), housed in a semi-permanent trailer located near a large covered grandstand facing the two launch pads.

The grandstand, built in 1967, was torn down following damage from Hurricane Frances in September 2004. Several media trailers and buildings on the mound were also damaged, and were either removed or replaced with prefabricated structures.

On November 10, 2014, NASA powered on the clock for the last time for a final system test. The clock was supposed to be removed and replaced before the Orion EFT-1 Launch. The old clock is currently on display at the KSC Visitor Complex.

== Media attendance ==
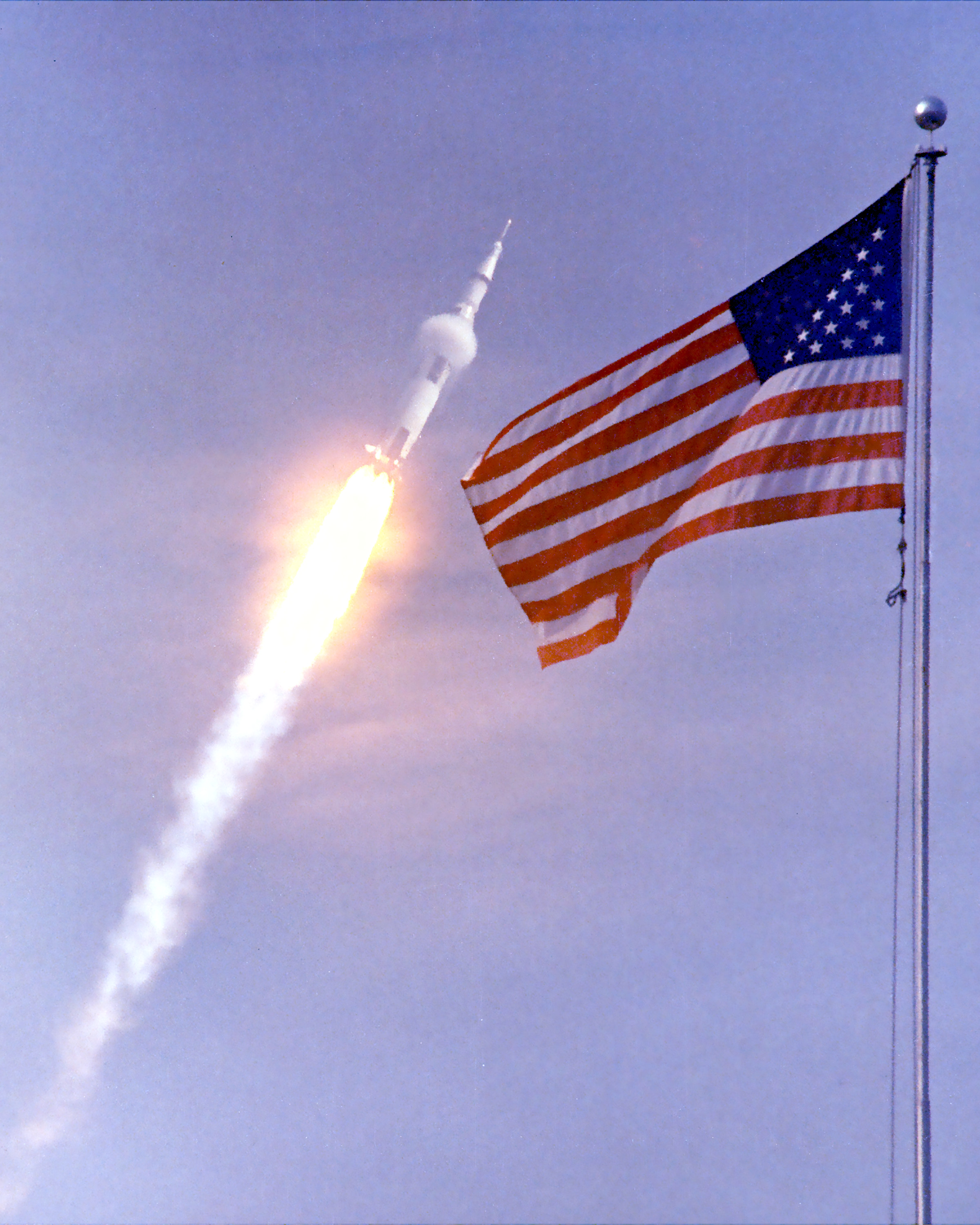
Composite photo of Apollo 11 launch and the Press Site flag

On July 16, 1969, 3,493 journalists from the U.S. and 55 other countries attended the launch of Apollo 11. A plaque noting the event placed in 1975 by Sigma Delta Chi, the Society of Professional Journalists, designates the location as an Historic Site in Journalism for "the largest corps of newsmen in history...to report fully and freely to the largest audience in history". After Apollo 11, however, media attendance diminished. Apollo 17, the last in the lunar landing program and its only night launch, prompted a resurgence in attendance, as did the Apollo-Soyuz Test Project launch in 1975.

The STS-1 launch on April 12, 1981 had 2,707 accredited representatives present. The second-largest number, 2,468, was for the STS-26 launch on September 29, 1988. Most, however, covered the launch from a more distant causeway viewing site because the LC-39 Press Site was restricted to a limited number of journalists as part of safety precautions implemented after the 1986 Challenger explosion. The restriction was dropped for subsequent launches. Media attendance spiked again in October 1998 for John Glenn's launch aboard STS-95, and for the final shuttle launch, STS-135, on July 8, 2011 when 1,585 news people attended.

== Historic status ==
On July 16, 1974, a crowd gathered at the Press Site to dedicate the entire launch complex as a National Historic Site, which had been listed as of May 24, 1973. The countdown clock was set to reach zero at 9:32 a.m. ET, exactly five years after the Apollo 11 liftoff. Astronauts Neil Armstrong, Buzz Aldrin and Mike Collins then unveiled a plaque commemorating their flight. On January 21, 2000, the "LC-39 Press Site–Clock and Flag Pole" were specifically added to the U.S. National Register of Historic Places as part of a Multiple Property Submission.
