= KSC Headquarters Building =

Office skyscraper at Kennedy Space Center

Kennedy Space Center Headquarters
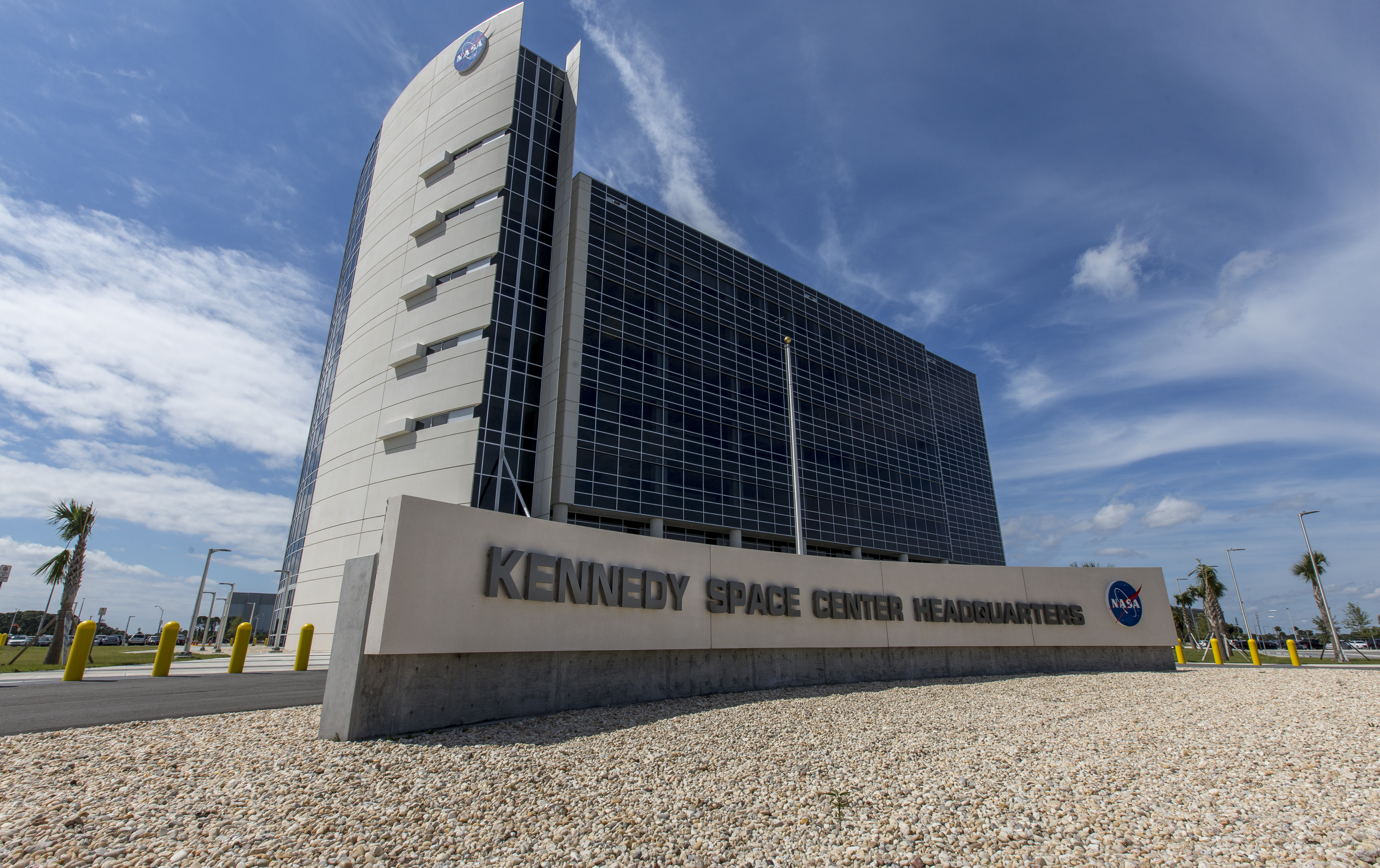
- The new KSC Headquarters Building as of April 2019
- Interactive map of the Kennedy Space Center Headquarters area
- Alternative names: Central Campus Facility

General information
- Status: Completed
- Type: Office
- Location: John F. Kennedy Space Center industrial complex
- Coordinates: 28°31′29″N 80°38′55″W
- Groundbreaking: October 10, 2014
- Completed: April 3, 2019
- Operator: Kennedy Space Center Operations Directorate

Height
- Roof: 104 ft (32 m)
- Top floor: 95 ft (29 m)

Technical details
- Floor count: 8
- Floor area: 200,017 sq ft (18,582.2 m^{2})
- Lifts/elevators: 6

Design and construction
- Architects: Steve Belflower, Kirk Hazen (HuntonBrady Architects of Orlando)
- Main contractor: NASA

Website
- Official website

The Kennedy Space Center Headquarters Building is an eight-story office building that houses the administrative offices of NASA's John F. Kennedy Space Center (KSC) in Florida. Completed in April 2019, the structure, also known as the Central Campus Headquarters Building, contains the offices of the center director, management staff, personnel, procurement, and several hundred contractor and support employees. It also accommodates the KSC Library, travel office, film and photo archives, photo processing facilities, the Engineering Document Center, print shop, mail room, credit union, and security offices. The 200,000 square feet (19,000 m^{2}) building features modern offices designed to evoke the décor of the former headquarters, with all major administrative functions consolidated under one roof. It is equipped with air conditioning and energy-efficient, adjustable LED lighting throughout.

== Background ==
As part of NASA's recent directives to expand and modernize the space center industrial complex to allow greater potential in the next space exploration programs, the Kennedy Space Center management office (including Robert D. Cabana) contracted Orlando-based architects and engineers to design and build a new headquarters building to replace the deteriorating original building adjacent to the site.

The center's Master Plan directive spans a 20-year horizon and details the land uses, business policies and infrastructure needed for the center to remain the prime launch site for the rising industry of government and commercial providers.

== Original building ==
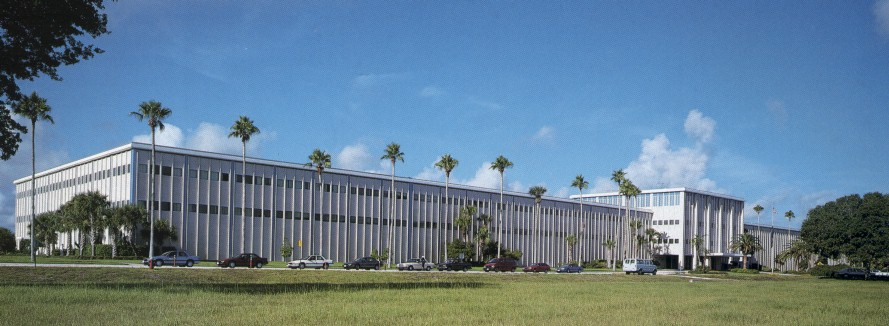
Plaza view of the original building

- Headquarters Building
- Formerly listed on the U.S. National Register of Historic Places
- Former U.S. National Historic Landmark
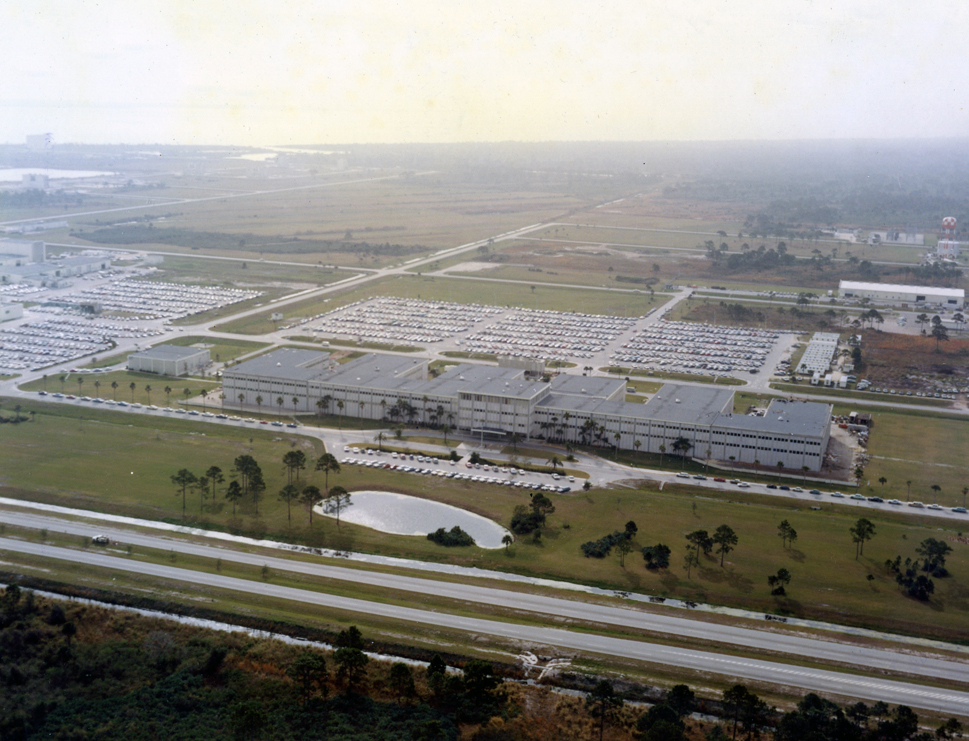
- Aerial view of the original KSC Headquarters looking south

- Location within Florida Location within the United States
- Location: John F. Kennedy Space Center industrial complex
- Nearest city: Titusville, Florida
- Coordinates: 28°31′27″N 80°39′4″W
- Built: 1965
- Architect: Charles Luckman
- Architectural style: International
- MPS: John F. Kennedy Space Center MPS
- NRHP reference No.: 99001644

Significant dates
- Added to NRHP: January 21, 2000
- Removed from NRHP: c. 2019

The original headquarters building was a three-story, six-wing concrete structure located. Designed by architect Charles Luckman in the International Style, it was officially opened on May 26, 1965, and contained 439,446 square feet (40,825 m^{2}) of floor space. Luckman, who also designed NASA's Manned Spacecraft Center in Houston, designed the structure to reflect the modernist aesthetics of the era. The facility was vacated in April 2019 following the completion of the new headquarters building. Although initially considered for renovation, the structure was ultimately deemed too costly to modernize due to material degradation, asbestos contamination, and rising maintenance costs. The building was demolished in January 2022.

== References and external links ==
- Brevard County listings at National Register of Historic Places
