= Space Shuttle recovery convoy =

Fleet of ground vehicles used during the Space Shuttle program

The Space Shuttle recovery convoy was a fleet of ground vehicles, many of which were specially designed for their purpose, staged at the landing site of a Space Shuttle orbiter which assisted the crew and its payload after landing. Some vehicles and equipment which were very specific to the shuttle program were retired and either sold at auction or transferred to museums for public display. The majority of convoy vehicles were stored in buildings near the Shuttle Landing Facility.

== Notable vehicles ==
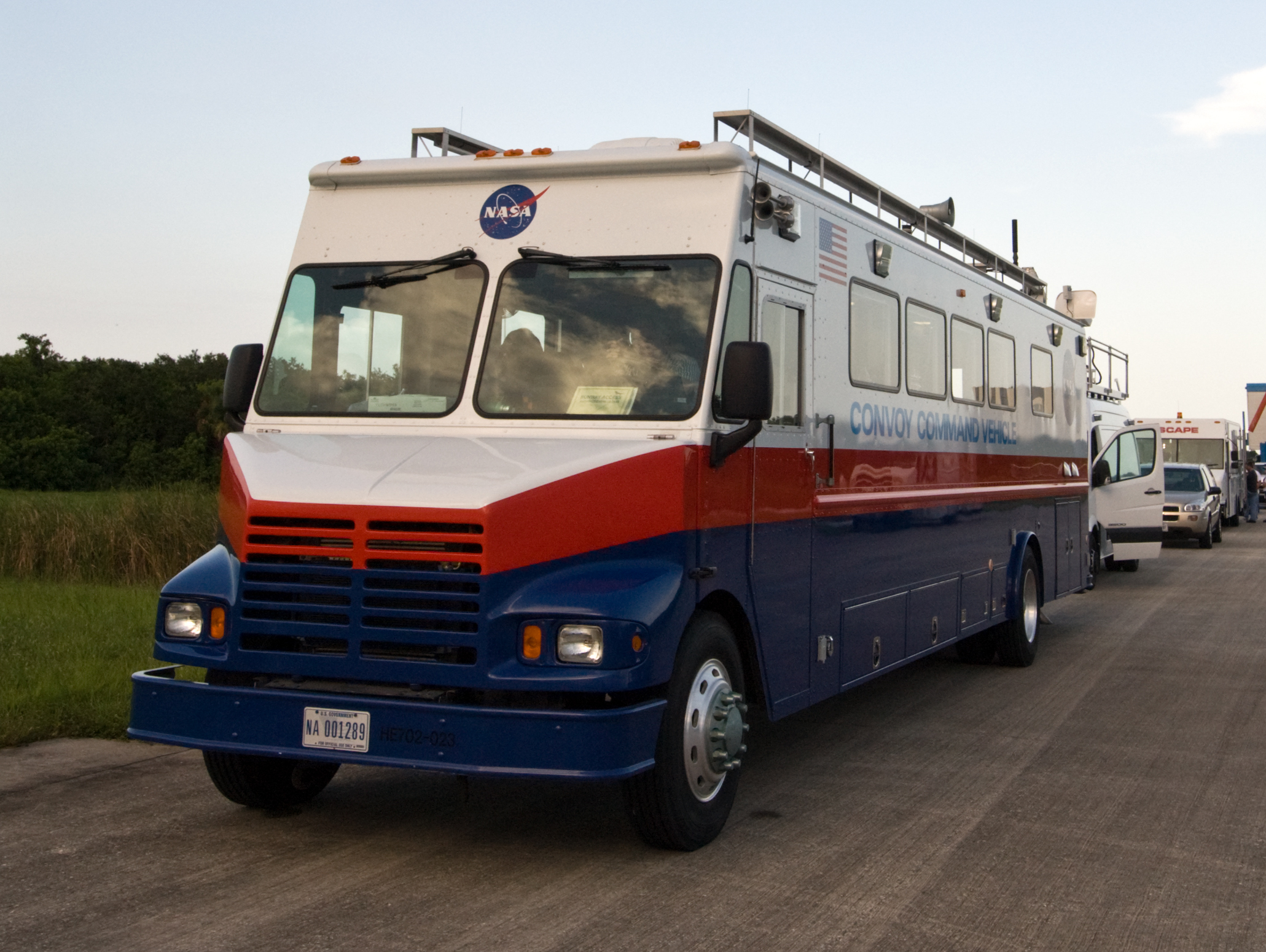
- post landing operations are coordinated from the 40-foot Convoy Command Vehicle
  Command Vehicle – commissioned June 27, 2002 the 40 feet (12 m) long Convoy Command Vehicle replaced the previous 15-year-old vehicle. The NASA Convoy Commander (NCC) directs personnel in the recovery convoy from this vehicle.
- SCAPE Trailer. Self-Contained Atmospheric Protection Ensemble (SCAPE), vehicle, parked at a midfield location during landing, contains the equipment necessary to support recovery including recovery crew SCAPE suits, liquid air packs, and a crew who assisted recovery personnel in suiting-up in protective clothing.
- Vapor Dispersal Unit. The Vapor Dispersal Unit is a mobile wind-making machine able to produce a directed wind stream of up to 45 miles per hour (72 km/h). It is an adaptation of a standard 14-ft. agricultural wind machine designed to protect fragile agricultural crops from frost damage or freezing. It is used by the recovery team to blow away toxic or explosive gases that may occur in or around the orbiter after landing. The fan can move 200,000 cubic feet of air a minute.
- Coolant Umbilical Access. This apparatus is a stair and platform unit mounted on a truck bed which permits access to the aft port side of the orbiter where ground support crews attach coolant lines from the Orbiter Coolant Transporter.
- Orbiter Coolant Transporters. This unit is a tractor-trailer carrying a refrigeration unit that provides Freon 114 through the orbiter's T-O umbilical into its cooling system.
- Purge Umbilical Access Vehicle. This vehicle is similar to the Coolant Umbilical Access Vehicle in that it has an access stairway and platform allowing crews to attach purge air lines to the orbiter on its aft starboard side.
- Orbiter Purge Transporter. This vehicle is a tractor-trailer which carries an air conditioning unit powered by two 300 KW, 60 Hz electric generators. The unit blows cool or dehumidified air into the payload bay to remove possible residual explosive or toxic gases.
- Crew Hatch Access Vehicle. The Crew Hatch Access Vehicle consisted of a stairway and platform on which is located a white room equipped with special orbiter interface seals. It contains pressurized filtered air to keep toxic or explosive gases, airborne dust or other contaminants from getting into the orbiter during crew egress. The vehicle was transferred to the Wings of Dreams Aviation Museum A similar vehicle intended for use for shuttle operations at Vandenberg Air Force Base is in storage at Edwards Air Force Based pending display at the Air Force Test Center Museum.
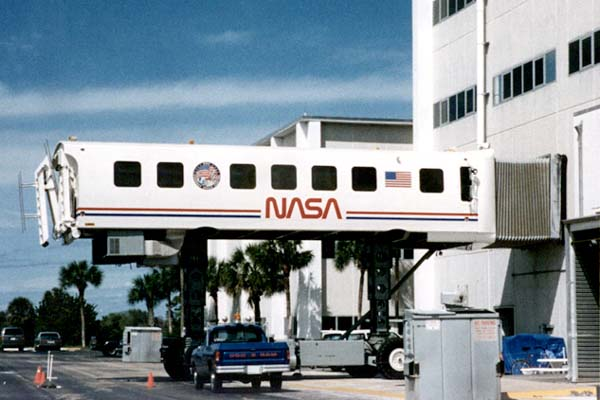
- The shuttle Crew Transport Vehicle – a converted people-mover
  Crew Transporter Vehicle placed aft of the Crew Hatch Access Vehicle, after orbiter egress, astronauts would step into this vehicle similar to mobile lounges on a scissor lift used at airports where flight surgeons would perform initial checks. The vehicle was intended to take astronauts directly to a 2nd floor entry in the Operations and Checkout Building in the KSC industrial area but in later missions, astronauts would exit the vehicle into the waiting astrovan for transport. The vehicle previously at the Kennedy Space Center was transferred to the Wings of Dreams Aviation Museum
- Astronaut Transfer Van. As its name implies, this van was used for the 20-minute ride transferring the flight crew on launch rehearsals and to the launch pad at the beginning of the mission and from the landing area at mission end. It is a modified recreational vehicle in which the crew can remove their flight suits and be examined by a physician while en route. Two astrovans were used during the space shuttle program. A smaller van used during the Apollo era was used for the first shuttle mission which included only two astronauts. A larger Airstream motorhome carried the larger shuttle crews of up to seven. Both vehicles are on display at the Kennedy Space Center Visitor Complex, the smaller in the Saturn V center and the larger beneath the Atlantis orbiter it served.
- Helium Tube Bank. This specialized vehicle is a trailer on which is mounted a 12-tube bank container which provides helium to purge hydrogen from the orbiter's main engines and lines. The bank contains 85,000 cubic feet (2,400 m^{3}) of helium at 6,000 pounds per square inch (41,000 kPa).
- Orbiter Tow Vehicle. This unit is very much like the typical towing units used for large aircraft. However, it was equipped with a special towing bar designed specifically for the orbiter. It was used to move the orbiter from the landing facility to the OPF. It also is used for moving the orbiter from the OPF to the VAB.
- Mobile Ground Power Unit. The final special vehicle for orbiter post-landing operations is the Mobile Ground Power Unit which provides power to the orbiter if the fuel cells have to be shut down. It can deliver a nominal load of up to 8 kW of direct power to the orbiter.
- Emergency vehicles
- NASA security vehicles
