= Highway Products, Inc. =

Highway Products, Inc., based in Kent, Ohio, was formed by Joseph Thomas 'Joe' Myers in 1960 to manufacture truck bodies for specialty markets such as mobile post offices. In addition to mail trucks and mobile post offices the company also manufactured small boats for both military and commercial use, missile launchers and engines. The company diversified into small transit buses and motorhomes in the late 1960s and early 1970s and was sold to Alco Standard Corporation in 1970; the Highway Products division of Alco Standard declared bankruptcy in 1975, ending production.

== History ==
The Twin Coach company, based in Kent and founded in 1927 by the brothers William B. and Frank R. Fageol, sold its bus manufacturing operation to Flxible in 1953, and Twin Coach would go on to sell its marine engine division in 1958 after Louis J. Fageol (son of Frank) retired. Twin Coach consolidated its remaining aircraft fuselage and wing manufacturing in Cheektowaga, New York, and Joe Myers initially leased a portion of the original Twin Coach factory in Kent to produce products for his new company, producing small and medium vehicles primarily on government contracts, then purchased a portion of the factory in 1962.

In 1968 Highway Products introduced a 25-passenger bus and sold it under the Twin Coach name as the TC-25. A 29-passenger TC-29 joined the lineup in 1969; the two models were sized identically, but the TC-29 had an extra row of seats instead of a rear door. The buses were powered by the Chrysler 440. Joe Myers sold the company to Alco-Standard in 1970. Approximately 900 buses were built under the Twin Coach name before production stopped in October 1975, due to bankruptcy.

Alco Standard's subsidiary Kent Industries bought the Cortez Motor Home line of products from Clark Forklift Company in 1970 and manufactured the motor homes in the Kent production facilities of Highway Products.

=== Joe Myers ===
Joe Myers also served as the President of the Davey Tree Expert Company and was married to John Davey's granddaughter, Marilyn Davey.
