= Astrovan =

Astrovan may refer to:

- Astronaut transfer van
- Chevrolet Astro
