= Twin Coach =

American vehicle manufacturing company

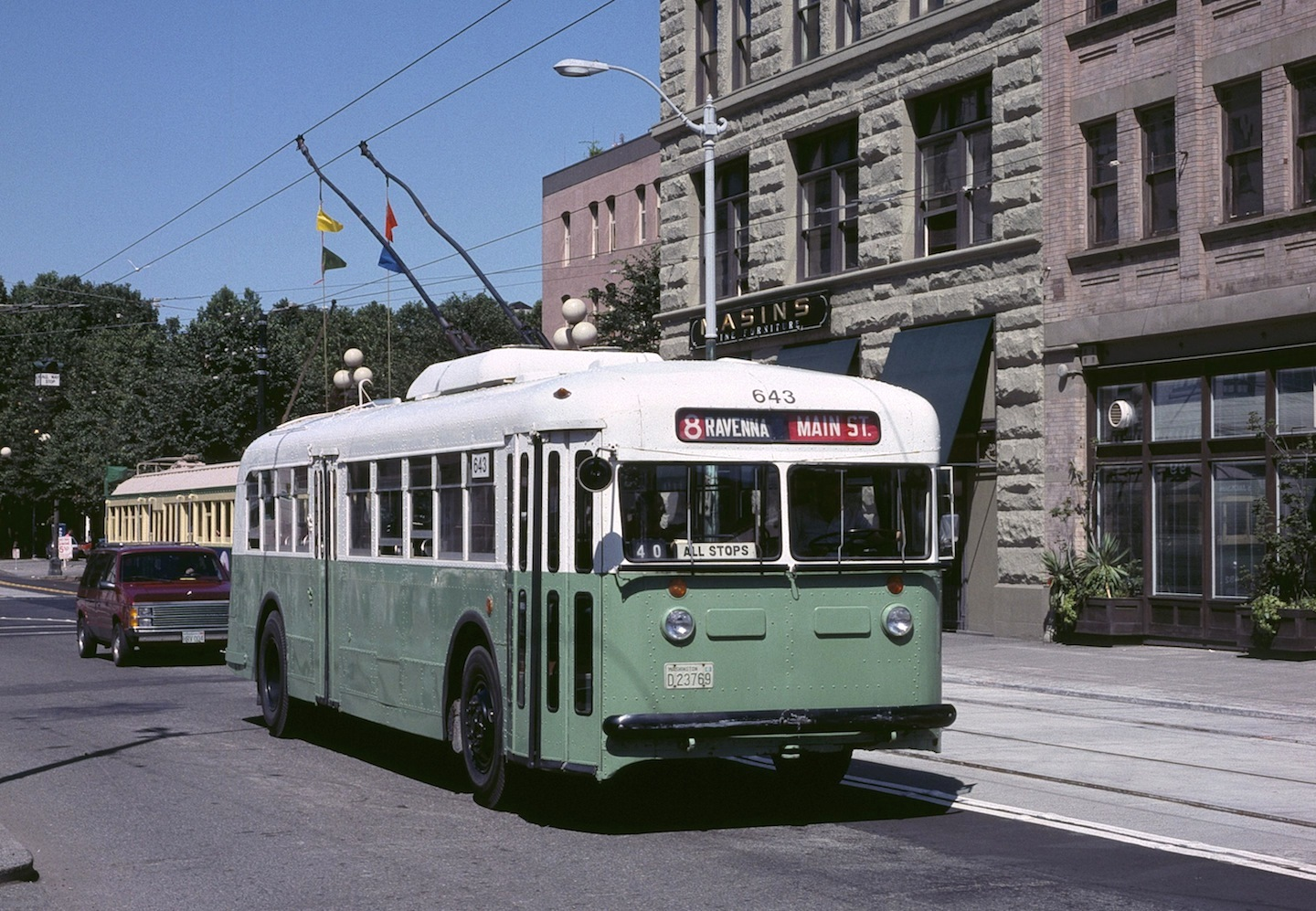
A restored 1940 Twin Coach trolley bus in Seattle

Twin Coach was an American vehicle manufacturing company from 1927 to 1955, located in Kent, Ohio, and a maker of marine engines and airplane parts until the 1960s. It was formed by brothers Frank and William Fageol when they left the Fageol Motor Company in 1927. They established the company in Kent to manufacture and sell buses with a new concept design. The body structure of this new bus was unique in that the body also became the frame and two engines – "twin" engines – were used to allow for larger passenger loads. This concept was patented by William B. Fageol.

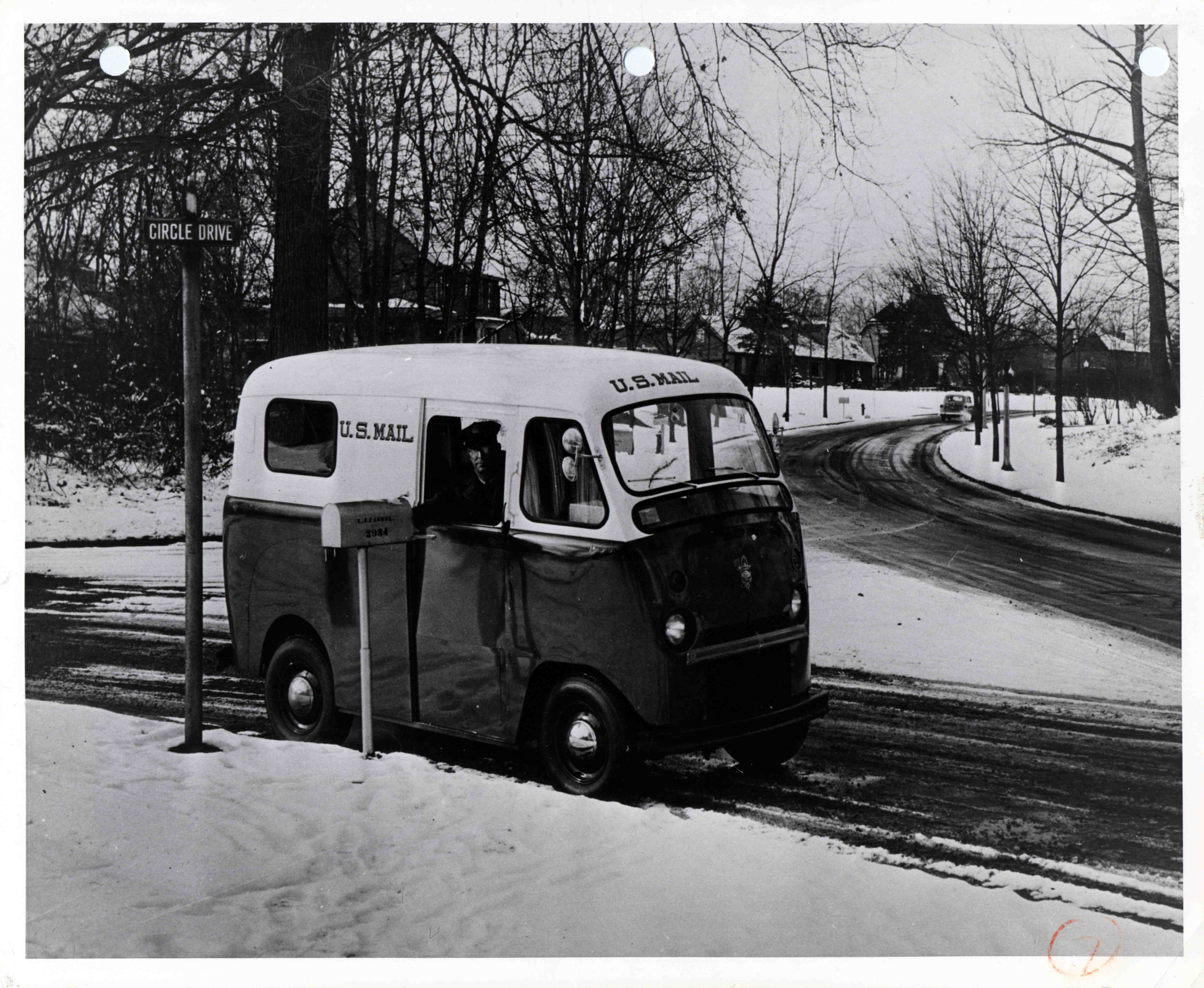
Twin Coach "Pony Express" postal van, circa 1953

Over the years, Twin Coach made transit buses, trolley buses, small delivery vehicles, Fageol six-cylinder gasoline/propane bus and marine engines, Fageol four-cylinder marine engines, and aircraft and truck components. The company was sometimes referred to as "Fageol-Twin Coach". The company was acquired by Flxible in 1955 and merged with it, but use of the "Twin Coach" name in marketing continued for a few years, and the name was briefly revived (as a brand name only) in the late 1960s by a related company called Highway Products, Inc.

== Production overview ==
=== Trolley buses ===
Trolley bus production lasted from 1928 to 1951. Notably, the company's first order and its last were also its only export orders ever for trolley buses: eight vehicles for Manila, Philippines, in 1928 and four for Belo Horizonte, Brazil, in 1951. All other orders went to U.S. cities., none to Canadian cities.

In the 1930s and 1940s, Twin Coach was one of the largest producers in the very limited field of trolley bus manufacturing in North America. Until the late 1940s, only three other U.S. companies built more trolley buses: the Brill companies (J.G. Brill and successors ACF-Brill and CCF-Brill), Pullman and St. Louis Car Company. Another builder, Marmon-Herrington, only entered the field in 1946, but eventually surpassed Twin's total. All told, Twin Coach manufactured only 670 "trolley coaches" – as such vehicles were commonly called at the time – but sold them to 16 different cities (all in the U.S.), which equates to around one-third of all of the trolley bus systems ever to exist in the United States. Overall, the company's best customer for trolley coaches was the Seattle Transit System, which bought a total of 177, all between 1940 and 1943.

In 1940, Twin Coach also pioneered the development of the articulated trolley bus in North America, although the first such vehicle in the world was built in Europe slightly earlier, in 1939 (by Isotta Fraschini/Stanga in Italy). The company built only two articulated trolley buses, and each was marketed as a "Super Twin" model. Both were originally built as demonstrators. The 1940 unit was eventually sold to the Cleveland transit system and entered service there. The second was built as a gas-powered bus in 1946, but was converted into a trolley bus in 1948, leased to the Chicago Transit Authority and was sold to CTA in 1954. With both vehicles, the articulation joint allowed only vertical, not horizontal, movement. These two prototypes never led to any series production, so each remained unique. The 1948 Chicago vehicle is preserved at the Illinois Railway Museum. Until 1985, these two vehicles remained the only articulated trolley buses ever built in North America by any manufacturer.

=== Motor buses ===
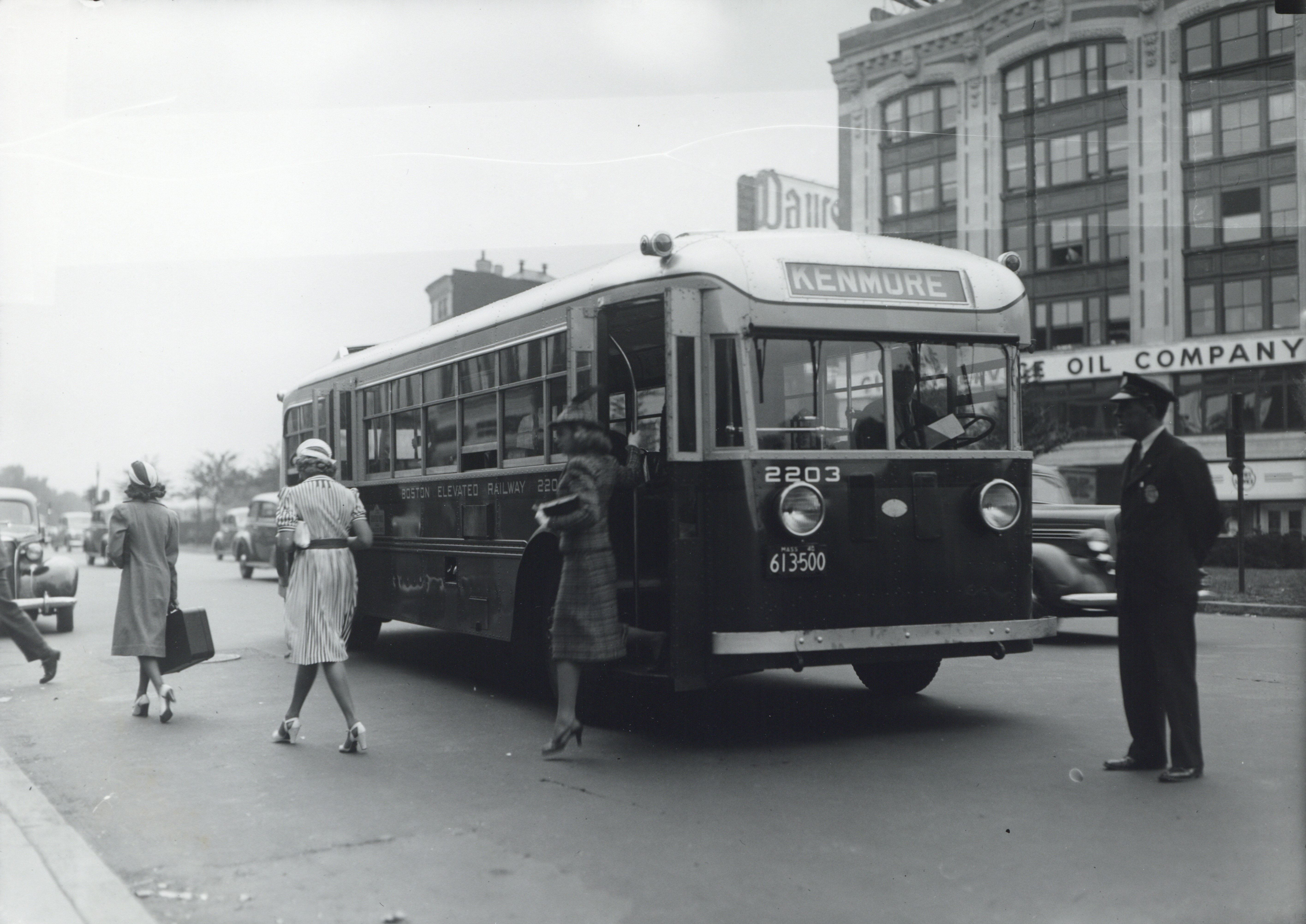
Twin 1937 Model 40-R(DE), in Boston Elevated Railway service, c. 1940

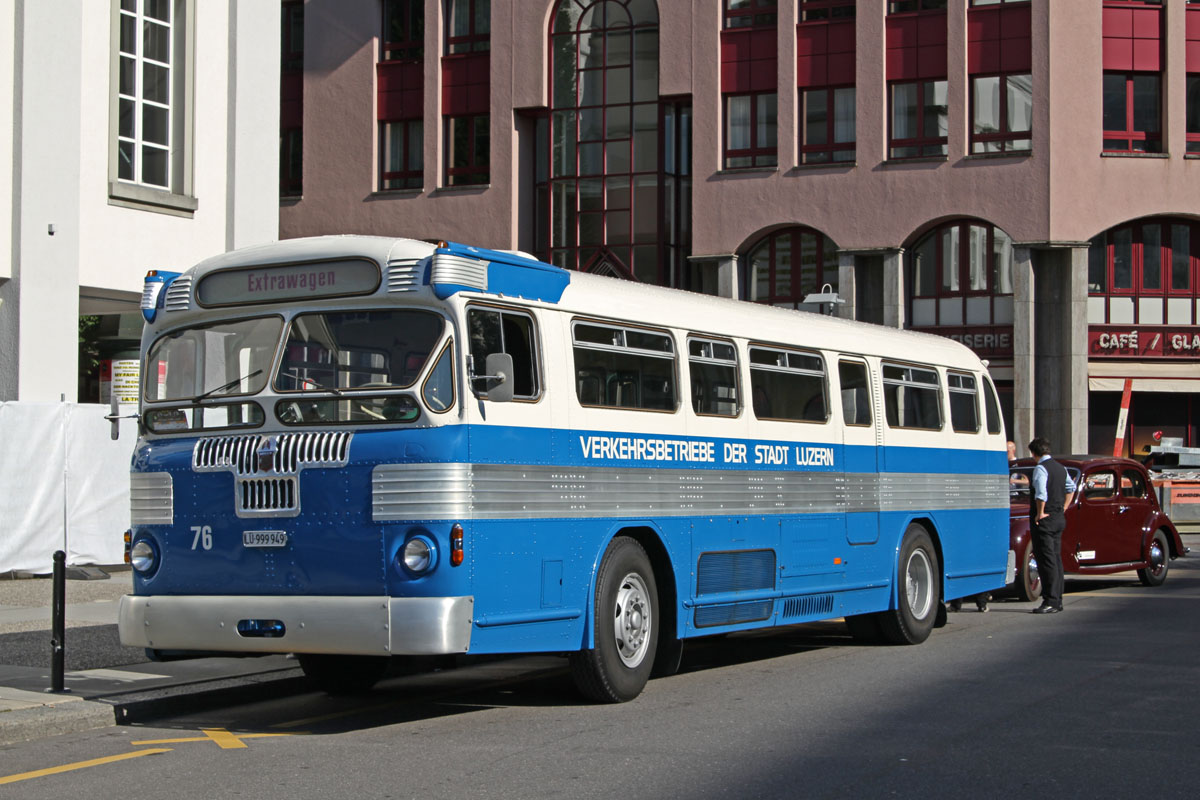
A Twin Coach/Herkules 38-S-DT (1948) in Lucerne, Switzerland

Twin Coach also built motor buses (buses powered by internal combustion engines). Fuels included at least gasoline and propane. Between 1927 and 1934 alone, the company built more than 1,100 motor buses, including 21 with gas-electric drive. Bus production continued through to the time of the company's acquisition by Flxible, in the 1950s. For many years the Fageol 'Twin Coach' was used to take passengers from Canada to US (and back) via the 'Detroit-Windsor Tunnel' under the Detroit River.

== Sale of bus division ==
In 1955, the bus manufacturing operations were sold to Flxible, which was also based in Ohio. For a time, Flxible used the Twin Coach name – along with its own – in its marketing and some buses carried front name plates that gave both names and combined the companies' two logos into one. By 1963, use of the Twin Coach name on buses had been discontinued.

The marine-engine and aircraft divisions continued as Twin Coach. In 1958, after selling the marine division to Crofton Manufacturing Company of Los Angeles, the company moved its remaining production to Cheektowaga, New York. In 1962, the company's name was changed to Twin Industries.

A portion of the company called Highway Products produced a number of products, such as small Post Office vehicles, mobile post offices used in rural areas, small boats for military and commercial uses, missile launchers and a variety of other products. Production of a small bus, sold under the "Twin Coach" name, began in 1969. In 1970, the company was sold and became a subsidiary of the Alco Standard company, continuing to produce the "Twin Coach" and Cortez Motor Homes until its bankruptcy in 1975.
