= NFTA fleet =

The Niagara Frontier Transportation Authority (also known as "NFTA" or "Metro") operates a fleet of buses and light rail vehicles in the cities of Buffalo and Niagara Falls and the surrounding Erie and Niagara counties. It is the second-largest transit system in New York state after New York City's.

== Rail cars ==
Images	Make	Model	Fleet number(s)	Model year	Division^{A}	Notes
	Tokyu Car Corporation		101-127	1983	SP	Light rail cars used on the Metro Rail line.; All 27 cars are undergoing a complete mid-life overhaul and reconstruction by AnsaldoBreda in Dansville, New York a few cars at a time. 26 of the rebuilt rail cars have returned to full service as of December 19, 2021. The new amenities include LED destination signs, replacing the old roll signs, LED next stop displays, new door mechanisms, newly repainted exteriors, a new interior, automated announcements, new propulsion systems and new door chimes.

== Active bus roster ==
A: Division assigned
BW	Babcock/William
CS	Cold Spring (Main/Michigan)
Fr	Frontier (Kenmore/Military)
SP	South Park

wheelchair-accessible and ADA compliant
equipped with bicycle racks

Images	Make	Model	Fleet number(s)	Model year	Division^{A}	Notes
	Gillig	Low Floor T40 Hybrid	1001-1011	2010	CS	Diesel-Electric; Entered service April 1, 2010; All 1000-series buses mark a return to full fiberglass passenger seating.
	Gillig	Low Floor T40 Hybrid	1101-1130	2011	CS	Diesel-Electric; 1130 came equipped with a Voith transmission, which allowed for conversion to full diesel.
	Gillig	Low Floor T40 Hybrid	1201-1214	2012	BW: 01-12; CS: 13,14	Diesel-Electric; 1214 came equipped with a Voith DIWA hybrid system transmission
	Gillig	Low Floor T40 Diesel	1012-1065	2010	CS: 12-19, BW: 20-65	First buses delivered that met EPA 2010 Emissions standards.
	Gillig	Low Floor T40 Trolley Replica	1066-1067	2010	Fr	Initially offered in 29 or 35 feet, the NFTA was the first agency to receive the 40' version.; Primarily used for the 55T Niagara Falls tourist line, but are also occasionally used on regular NFTA routes, especially during the winter.
	Gillig	Low Floor T40 Trolley Replica	1301-1304	2013	Fr	Primarily used for the 55T Niagara Falls tourist line, but are also occasionally used on regular NFTA routes, especially during the winter.
	Nova Bus	LFS CNG	1501-1520	2015	Fr	First buses equipped with driver partition door that allows for full enclosure if desired.; Currently the NFTA is the only transit agency in the United States to use the buses.; CNG buses.; First fleet to use LED headlights.
	Nova Bus	LFS CNG	1601-1624	2016	Fr	Currently the NFTA is the only transit agency in the United States to use the buses.; CNG buses.; First fleet to use LED headlights.
	Nova Bus	LFS CNG	1701-1716	2017	Fr	CNG Buses
	Nova Bus	LFS CNG	1801-1816	2018	Fr	CNG Buses; New sign graphics distinguished by broader lettering and four digit block signs
	Nova Bus	LFS CNG	1901-1923	2019	Fr	Equipped with new Quantum wheelchair restraint systems and second message sign.
	Nova Bus	LFS Diesel	1717-1724	2017	CS	
	Nova Bus	LFS Diesel	1817-1824	2018	BW	New sign graphics distinguished by broader lettering and four digit block signs
	Nova Bus	LFS Diesel	2315-2324	2023	BW	First buses since 1996 not to be equipped with rear destination sign
	Nova Bus	LFS Diesel	2261-2270	2022	BW	New Driver Window eliminates dangerous blind spot
	Nova Bus	LFS Diesel	2464-2473	2024	BW	In process of Delivery; Last New Novas purchased from the Plattsburgh, NY plant as NovaBus is ceasing operations in the US as of 2025
	New Flyer	Xcelsior XE40	2251-2260	2022	CS	First 10 full electric buses.; First buses with new livery
	New Flyer	Xcelsior XE40	2301-2314	2023	CS	First buses since 1996 not to be equipped with rear destination sign
	New Flyer	Xcelsior XE40	2451-2463	2024	CS	
	New Flyer	Xcelsior XE40	2651-2658	2026	CS	Last of 45 planned Xcelsior XE40 BEV buses
	New Flyer	Xcelsior XE40	2659-2670	2026	BW	In process of Construction, delivery due first quarter 2027; >

== Historic fleet ==
The NFTA inherited a large number of General Motors New Look buses from the private carriers that were absorbed into the agency. In addition, a small fleet of Highway Products' Twin Coaches and Mack buses that were nearing the end of their life span were also added to the fleet. The first major purchase of new buses by the NFTA began in 1975 with AM General's "Metropolitan" series buses. These buses were later withdrawn from service in 1987 due to severe structural issues. To address this immediate shortage of buses, the NFTA purchased a number of recently mothballed GMC buses from the Dallas Area Rapid Transit system (DART), Flxible buses from Rochester's Regional Transit Service and General Motors New Looks from Broome County Transit (BC Transit) of Binghamton. This temporary arrangement filled most of the gap left by the removal of the AM General buses.

The next major purchase of new buses came from GMC, in their RTS-II Series. These buses were purchased between 1978 and 1983. As mentioned earlier, in 1987, due to the premature retirement of the AM General buses, the NFTA purchased a number of used, earlier series RTS series buses from Dallas' DART system. These buses provided comfortable padded seats, normally not seen on standard NFTA transit coaches. These buses operated for a number of years and were a deal to the NFTA in that the coach bodies previously did not experience earlier damage from road salt, sometimes referred to as "salt-free" miles, extending their usefulness a number of years because of the frames having a later start being introduced to corrosion from road salt.

In 1985, the NFTA purchased seven new suburban-configuration buses from Orion Bus Industries (OBI) to begin replacing the older inherited GMC buses from previously private agencies. This purchase marked the last purchase of non-lift equipped buses, and the first non-American purchase of new buses. Over the next seven years, OBI received additional orders of buses from the NFTA with purchases of two different models, the Orion I series and the Orion V, which the NFTA later purchased in 1993 as their first natural gas powered buses.

In 1992 and 1994, the NFTA purchased from two manufacturers, new to the NFTA; Motor Coach Industries, in their Classic series of transit coaches and New Flyer Industries, in their D40 series. In 1995, a third manufacturer was added, with North American Bus Industries/American Ikarus in their 416 series transit bus.

== See also ==
- Niagara Frontier Transportation Authority
