= Clark Material Handling Company =

American forklift truck manufacturer

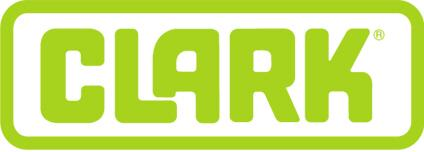
- Formerly: Clark Tructractor Company
- Type: Manufacturing
- Industry: Material Handling
- Founded: 1917 in Buchanan, Michigan
- Founder: Eugene B. Clark
- Headquarters: Dallas, Texas, United States
- Key people: Chuck Moratz President and CEO; Jeff Gallegos Chief Operating Officer; Jon Nederveld VP of Commerce; Brandon Bullard VP of Sales; Mark Dyster Director of Product Support and Engineering; Jeff English General Counsel; Dan Kaiser VP of Finance & Controller
- Number of employees: 1,500
- Parent: Clark Equipment Company (1919–2003); Young An Hat Company (2003–Present)
- Website: www.clarkmhc.com

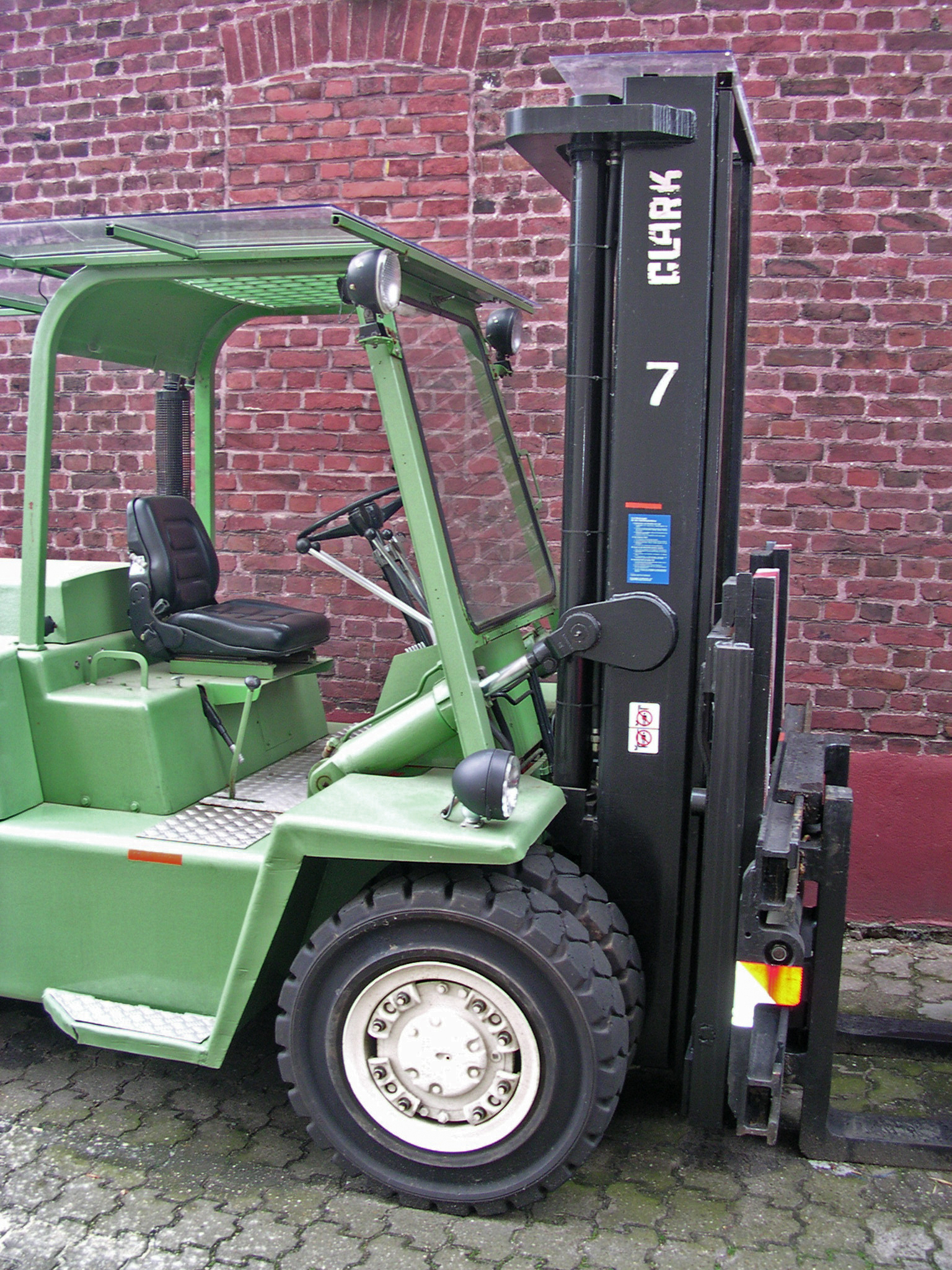
German Clark forklift CY100PD

Clark Material Handling Company (CMHC), is a Korean owned American manufacturer of Clark branded forklift trucks. The company has manufacturing facilities in Changwon, South Korea, Lexington, Kentucky, Qingdao, China, and Hanoi, Vietnam. The U.S. branch of the company is based in Dallas, Texas. Clark currently offers products in all five forklift classes, ranging from hand pallet jacks to 18,000 pound-capacity sit down forklifts.

Clark is credited with having invented the world's first truck with a hydraulic lifting mechanism in 1924, an attachment to the Duat tow tractor. This internal combustion truck with hydraulic lifting mechanism became the forerunner to modern forklift trucks.

The company began as the George R. Rich Manufacturing Company, a manufacturer of steel products, which was purchased by the Illinois Steel Company in 1897. In 1904, they tasked Eugene Clark, a young engineer working for the Illinois Steel Company, with improving the product, facility, and prosperity of the George R. Rich Manufacturing Company. Eugene Clark refined the product, improved facility efficiency, and rearranged the staff to optimize productivity, and under his leadership, they renamed the company to the Celfor Tool Company in 1907, after their staple product, the Celfor Drill.

In 1916, after enjoying many years of success, growth, and expansion, they renamed the company the Clark Equipment Company, after Eugene Clark. In 1917, the Clark Equipment Company invented the Tructractor, the world's first internal combustion shop buggy. As interest in the Tructractor grew, Clark Equipment Company split into two branches: Clark Equipment and Clark Tructractor Company. The current CLARK Material Handling Company is a direct descendant of the Clark Tructractor Company division. Clark continued to innovate, introducing tow tractors, and, in 1924, the first forklift - a modified Duat tow tractor with a hydraulic lifting mechanism. As Clark continued to grow and diversify its product line, it became known for producing the highest quality, and durable trucks on the market. Clark has been the leader in safety, innovation, and quality for the material handling industry for over 100 years. In 2003, Clark was purchased by the Young An Hat Company of Korea, which owns the company to this day.

== History ==
In 1994, the Genesis model line of four-wheel internal combustion cushion and pneumatic-tire fork lifts was introduced. The Genesis featured a rubber isolated operator cell to improve operator comfort and set new industry standards for productivity and reliability.

In 1997, Clark built its one millionth forklift.

In 1999, Clark Aftermarket Parts Depot in Louisville, Kentucky, was opened.

in 2003, Clark Material Handling Company was acquired by Young An Hat Company, headquartered in Seoul, South Korea. They also acquired Clark Material Handling Asia.

In 2006, Production of stand-up electric fork lift trucks moved to the facility in Lexington, Kentucky.

In 2019, Clark opened a factory in Vietnam. The OSQ, a 24-volt working platform vehicle, was introduced. The HWXE/PWXE was introduced. The facilities at its North American corporate headquarters are expanded in Lexington, Kentucky, adding a third facility to the company's manufacturing operation. The CLARK product certification course is opened. This course is designed to validate and test new products and components.

2021, The WPL40 lithium-ion walkie pallet stacker is introduced. With a 4,000-pound capacity, the ability to opportunity charge, and built-in safety features, the WPL40 is the perfect option for trucking and 3PL customers. The SE15-25T is introduced.

== See also ==
- Forklift truck
- Cortez Motor Home
