= Fageol =

American vehicle manufacturer

Coordinates: 37.738644°N 122.166240°W

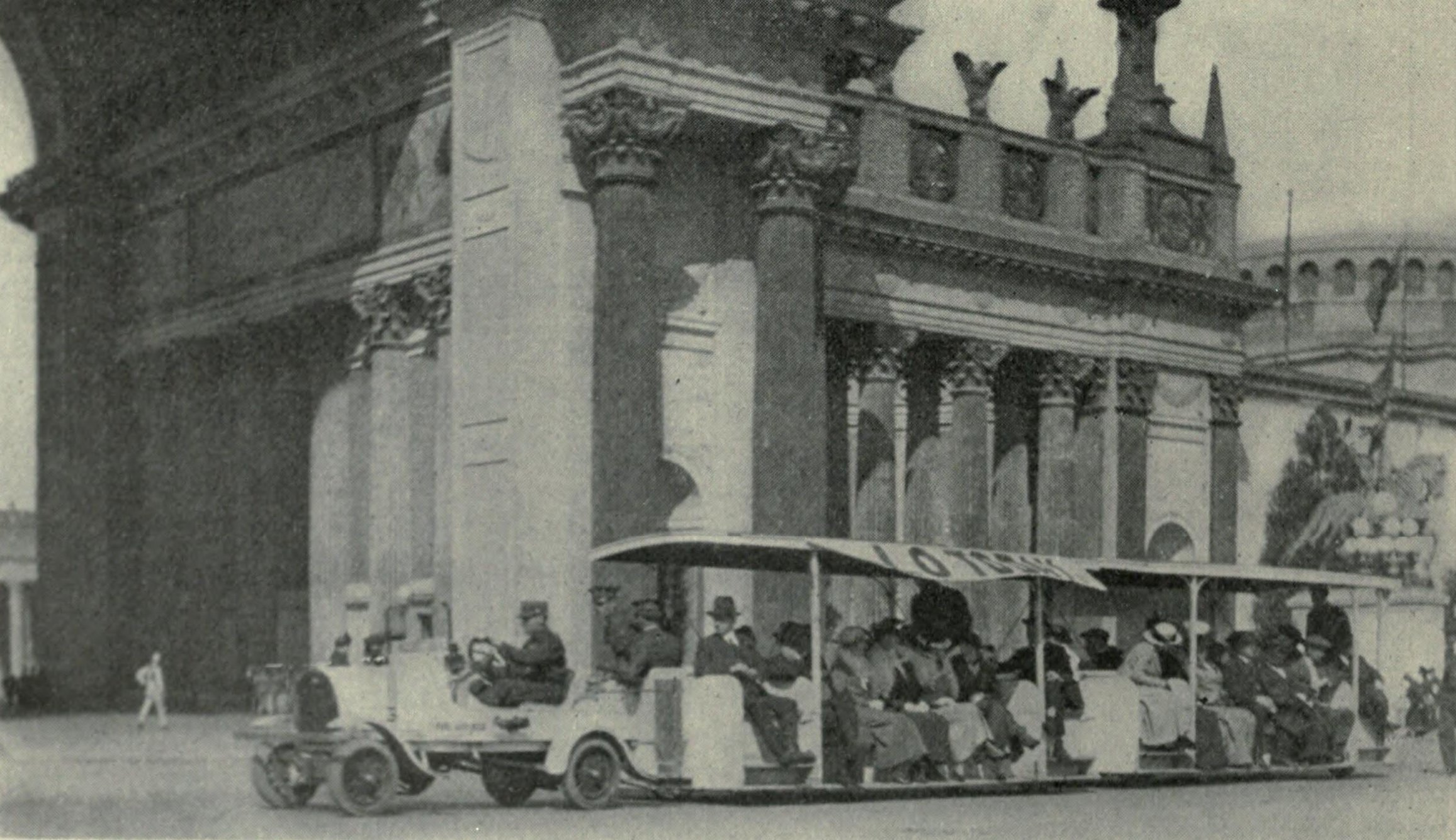
Fageol Auto Train or Trackless Train at the Panama–Pacific International Exposition, 1915, San Francisco

Fageol Motors was a United States manufacturer of buses, trucks and farm tractors.

== History ==
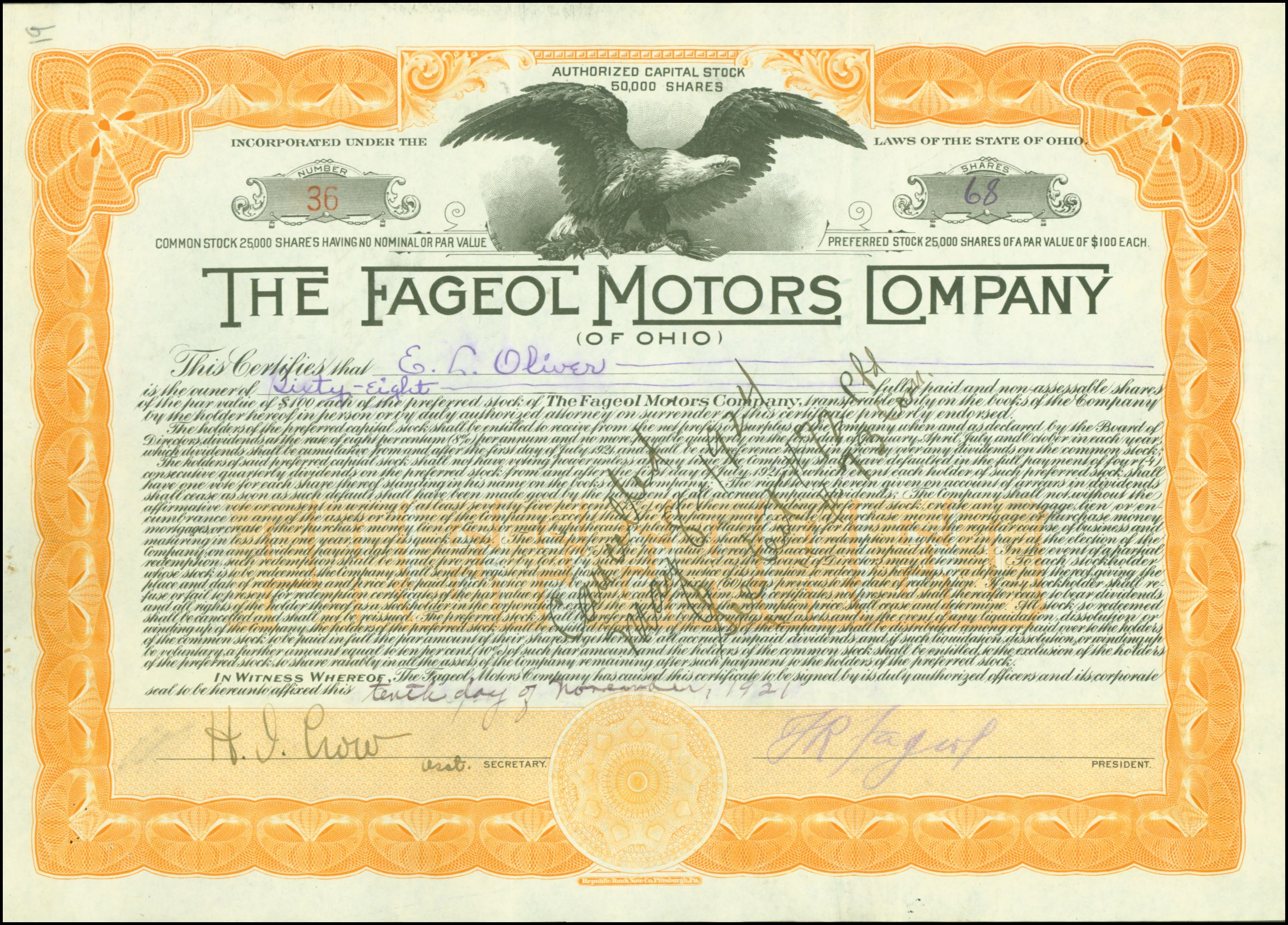
Share of the Fageol Motors Company, issued 10. November 1921

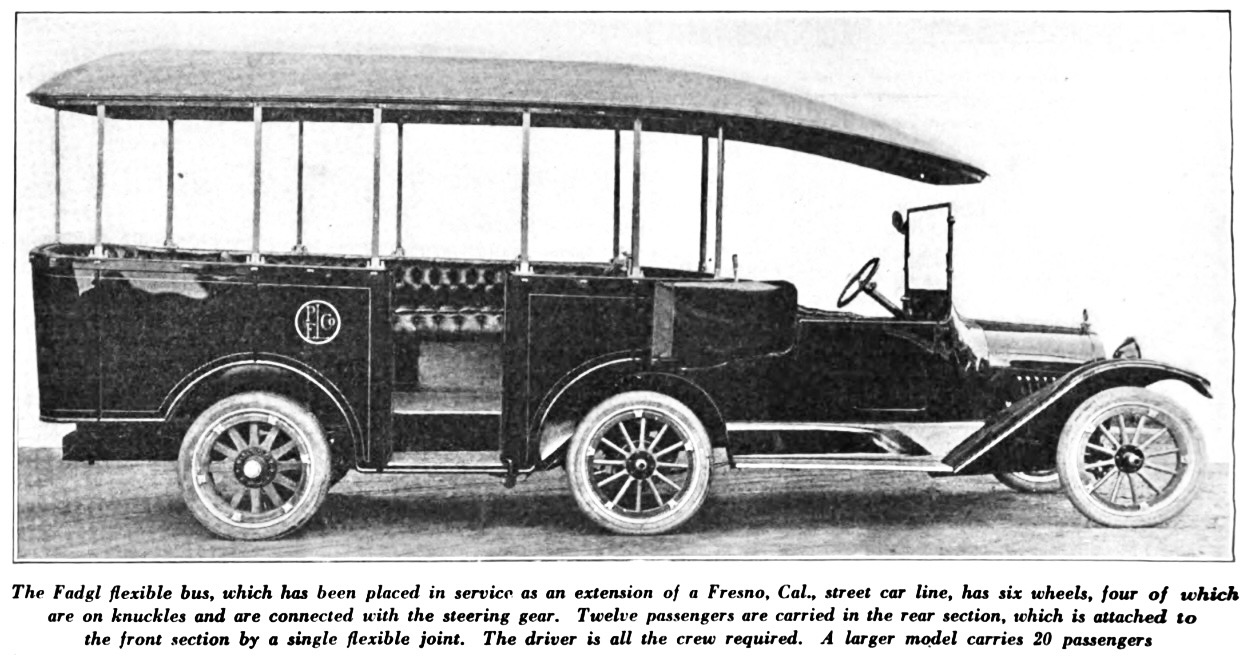
Six wheel bus created by Rollie Fageol (1916)

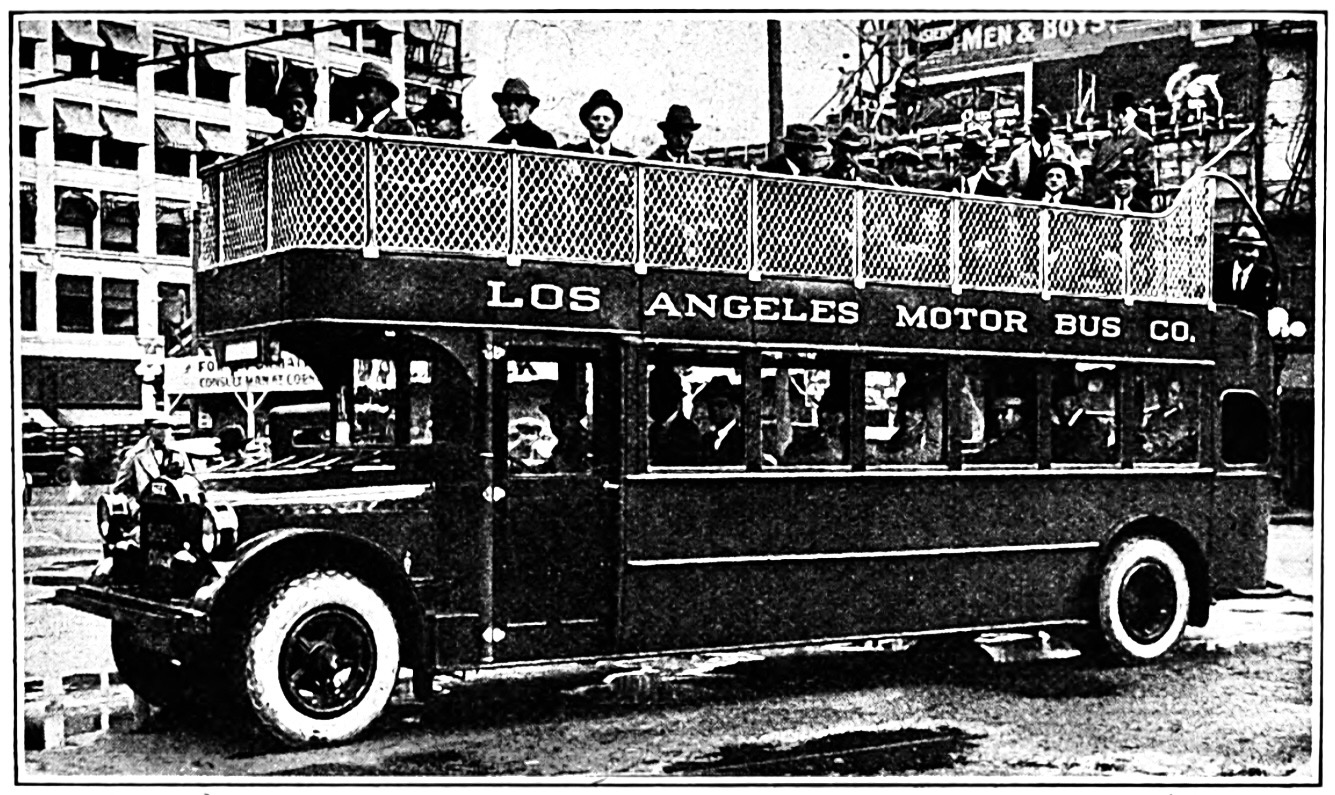
Fageol Double Decker (1924)

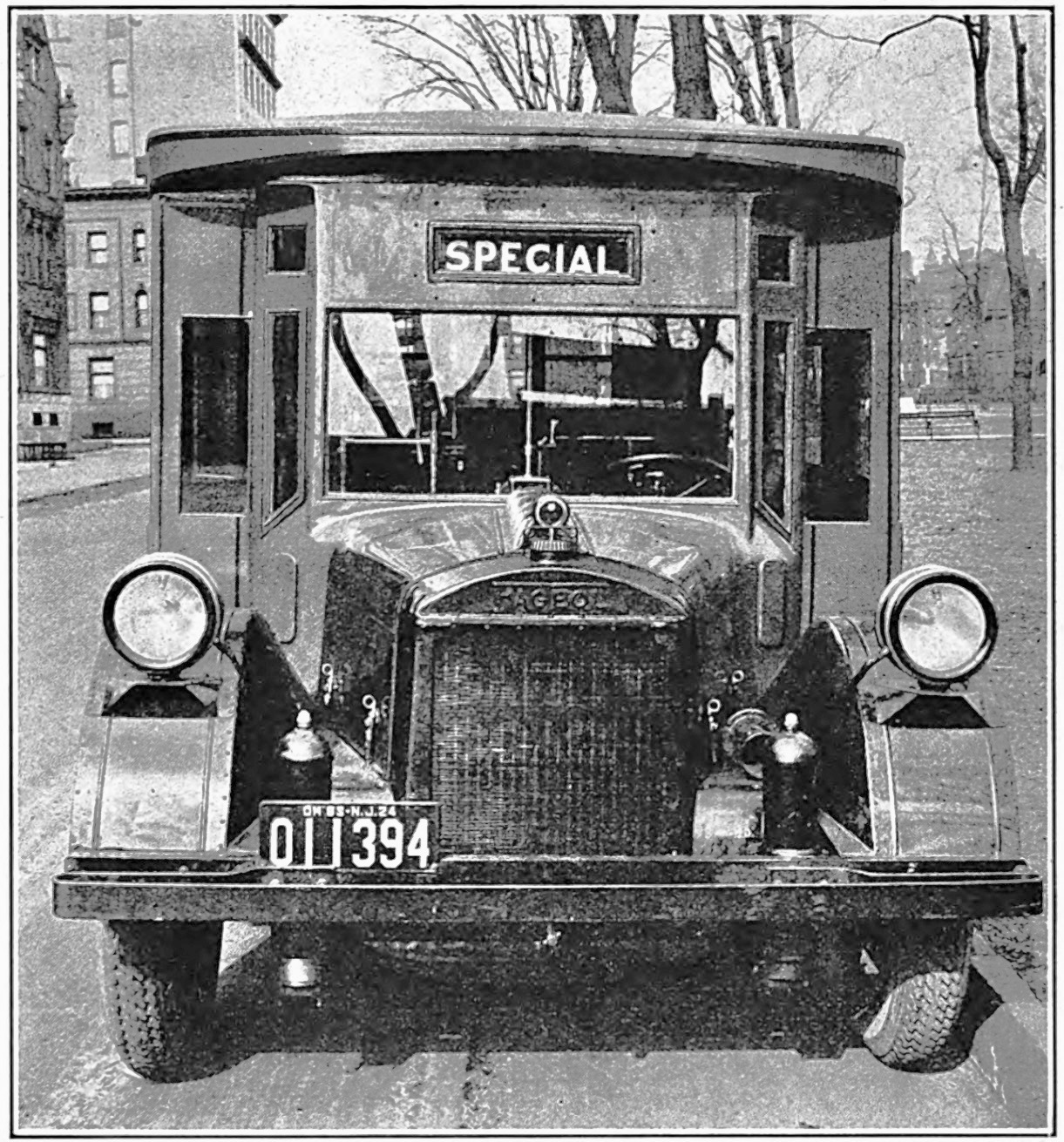
Fageol bus (1924)

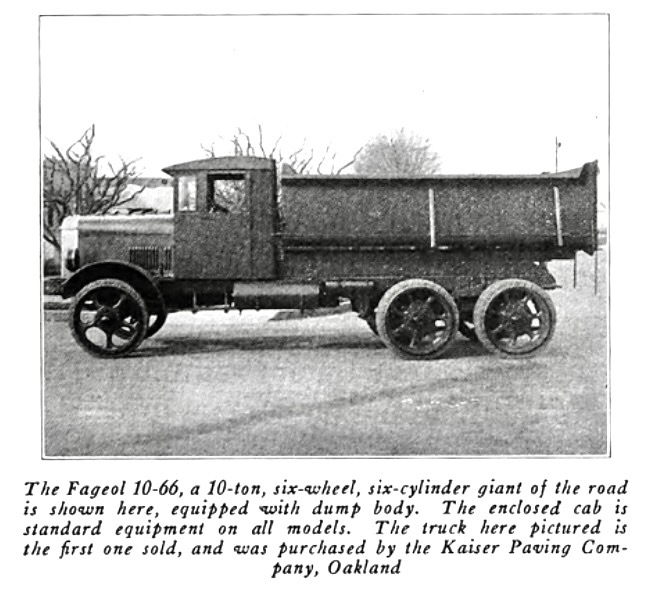
Fageol 10-66 (1927-1930)

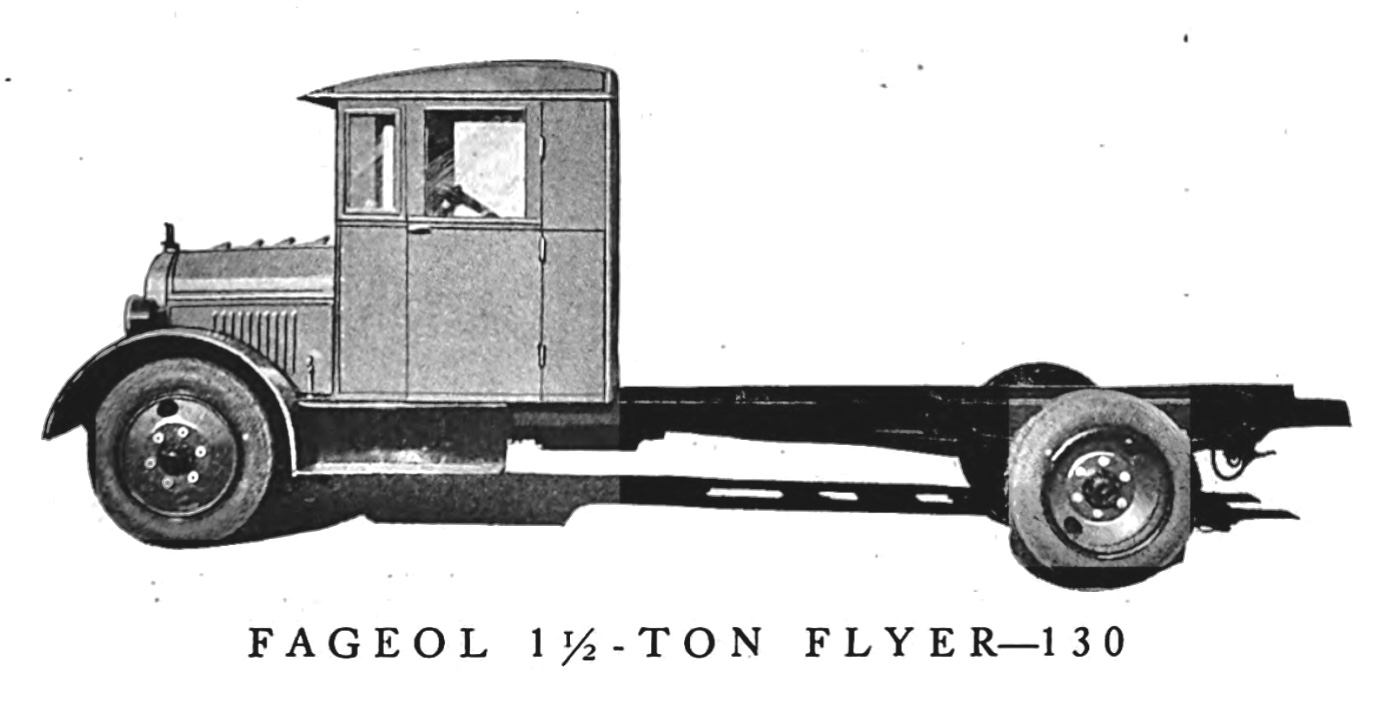
Fageol 130 (1929-1930)

The company was founded in 1916, in Oakland, California, by Rollie, William, Frank and Claude Fageol, to manufacture motor trucks, farm tractors and automobiles. It was located next to Oakland Assembly, then a Chevrolet factory originally built in 1916 by William Durant, which later became part of General Motors.

Fageol produced two luxury automobiles, but production was halted when the supply of Hall-Scott SOHC six-cylinder engines was diverted to build airplanes for the war in World War I.

The first Fageol farm tractor was a re-labeled Hamilton walking tractor, designed and built by Rush E. Hamilton of Geyserville, California. As a result of the many tractor performance trials of the day, the tractor was redesigned to be more compatible with the needs of the West Coast. The Fageol version was designed by a team led by Horatio Smith with the cooperation of Hamilton. In about 1923, the tractor business was sold to the Great Western Motors Company of San Jose, with Hamilton and Smith joining Great Western.

In 1921, Fageol became the first company to build a bus from the ground up. The new-style bus was initially called "Safety Bus", and the goal was to build a bus that was resistant to overturning when cornering. It had a wide track, and was lower to the ground for ease of entry and exit. Following their successful introduction, the vehicles were renamed "Safety Coaches", a term intended to imply greater value.

Fageol trucks became favorites of the industry owing, in part, to the dual range, mid-mounted transmission. That gearbox allowed for extreme ranges in gearing, ranging from slow-speed heavy hauling to highway speeds with lighter loads. The vehicles were easily spotted, due to the large number "7" painted on the front of the radiator.

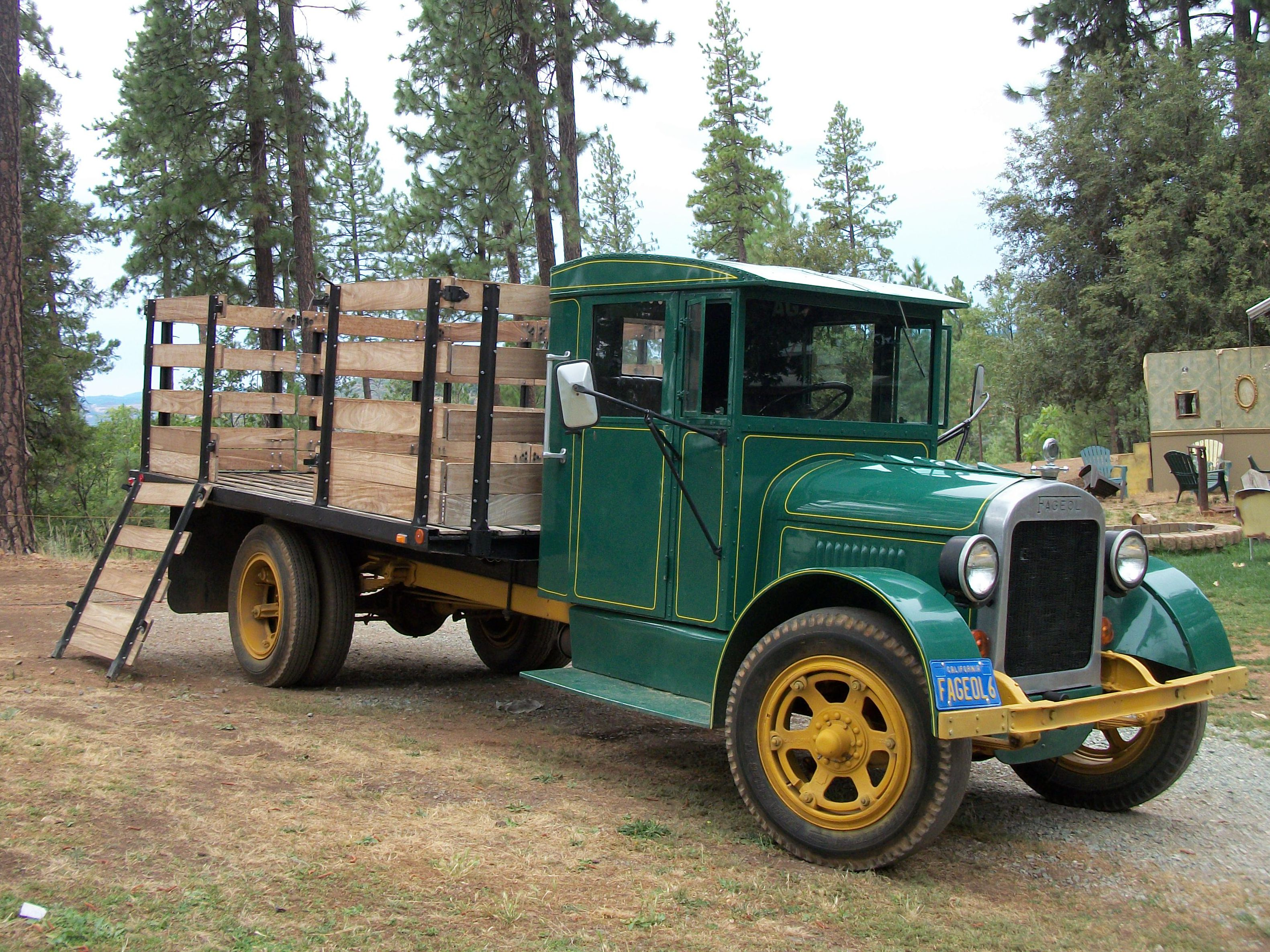
Fageol flatbed truck, 1928 model year

The Fageol brothers left the company in 1927 to form the Twin Coach Company, manufacturing buses in Kent, Ohio. Leadership of the business was taken over by company president L.H. Bill, but during the Great Depression the company went into receivership. The bank assumed control and reorganized the company under the name Fageol Truck and Coach. In 1938, T. A. Peterman bought the factory and its contents. In 1939, the first Peterbilt was produced.

The South Australian Railways (SAR) operated a number of Fageol buses. In 1932, that system introduced the first of four railcars, converted from road buses at Islington Railway Workshops. The vehicles initially operated on the SAR 3 ft 6 in (1,067 mm) gauge Eyre Peninsula Railway, but some were transferred to the Kingston to Naracoorte line, prior to the line's conversion to 5 ft 3 in (1,600 mm) broad gauge. Because the buses were not designed for rail use, the ride was very rough. The last Fageol railcar was condemned in 1961.

== Production ==
Year	Production figures	Model	Load capacity	Serial number
1917	53		2,5 to	1001 to 1053
	14		3,5 to	3001 to 3014
	9		5 to	5001 to 5009
1918	130		2,5 to	1054 to 1183
	82		3,5 to	3015 to 3096
	19		5 to	5010 to 5028
1919	84		2,5 to	1184 to 1267
	102		3,5 to	3097 to 3198
	27		5 to	5029 to 5055
1920	15		1,5 to	25000 to 25014
	164		2,5 to	1268 to 1431
	119		3,5-4 to	3199 to 3317
	31		5-6 to	5056 to 5086
1921	49		1,5 to	25052 to 25100
	62		2,5 to	1432 to 1493
	43		3,5 to	3318 to 3360
	9		5-6 to	5087 to 5095
1922	37		1,5 to	25101 to 25137
	55		2,5 to	1494 to 1548
	46		3,5-4 to	3361 to 3406
	40		5-6 to	5096 to 5135
	↓		⟨Safety Stage, Inter City, Parlor car⟩	10001 to
1923	45		1,5 to	25138 to 25182
	102		2,5 to	1549 to 1650
	108		3,5-4 to	3407 to 3514
	16		5-6 to	5136 to 5151
	260		⟨Safety Stage, Inter City, Street car, Safety Coach, Oberservation⟩	10001 to 10260
1924	43		1,5 to	25183 to 25225
	160		2,5 to	1551 to 1710
	45		3,5-4 to	3515 to 3559
	5		5-6 to	5152 to 5156
	516		⟨Safety Stage, Inter City, Street car, Oberservation ⟩	10261 to 10550, 20001 to 20225
	33		⟨Double Decker⟩	35001 to 35033
1925	36	235	2 to	25225 to 25260
	94	340	3 to	1710 to 1803
	25	360	3 to	6001 to 6025
	42	445	4 to	3560 to 3601
	13	645	6 to	5156 to 5168
	580		⟨ Inter City, Street car, Oberservation ⟩	10551 to 11029 , 20266 to 20366
	27		⟨Double Decker⟩	35039 to 35065
1926	46	230	2 to	8012 to 8057
		235	2 to	25261 to
	52	340	3 to	1804 to 1855
	27	445	4 to	3602 to 3628
		360	3 to	6026 to
	11	645	6 to	5169 to 5179
		490	6 to	4011 to
			⟨ Inter City, Street car, Parlor car ⟩	20367 to , 11030 to
			⟨Double Decker⟩	35066 to
1927	355	Flyer	1,5 to	B-117 to B-471
		230 B	2,5 to	8058 to
	29	340	3 to	1856 to 1884
	107	370	3 to	9023 to 9129
	27	445	4 to	3629 to 3655
	14	485	4 to	4071 to 4084
		645	6 to	5180 to
		685	6 to	5180 to
	36	10-66	10 to	13001 to 13036
			⟨ Inter City, Street car, Observation ⟩	20456 to , 11046 to
			⟨Double Decker⟩	35083 to
1928		Flyer	1,5 to	B-472 to
(~ 1,000)		130	1,5 to	B-472 to
		135	2 to	C-37 to
		250	2,5 to	E-3 to
		230 B	2,5 to	
		340	3 to	1885 to
		370	3,5 to	9130 to
		445	4 to	3656 to
		485	4,5 to	4085 to
		645	6 to	5192 to
		685	6,5 to	7213 to
		10-66	10 to	13037 to
1929		100	1 to	
(~ 1,000)		130	1,5 to	
		135	2 to	
		250	2,5 to	
		340	3 to	
		365	3 to	
		370	3,5 to	
		445	4 to	
		485	4,5 to	
		645	6 to	
		685	6,5 to	
		10-66	10 to	
		⟨255⟩	bus	
		⟨255 A⟩	bus	
		⟨255 B⟩	bus	
1930	~ 484			
1931	~ 317			

in angle bracket = ⟨bus⟩

== Products ==
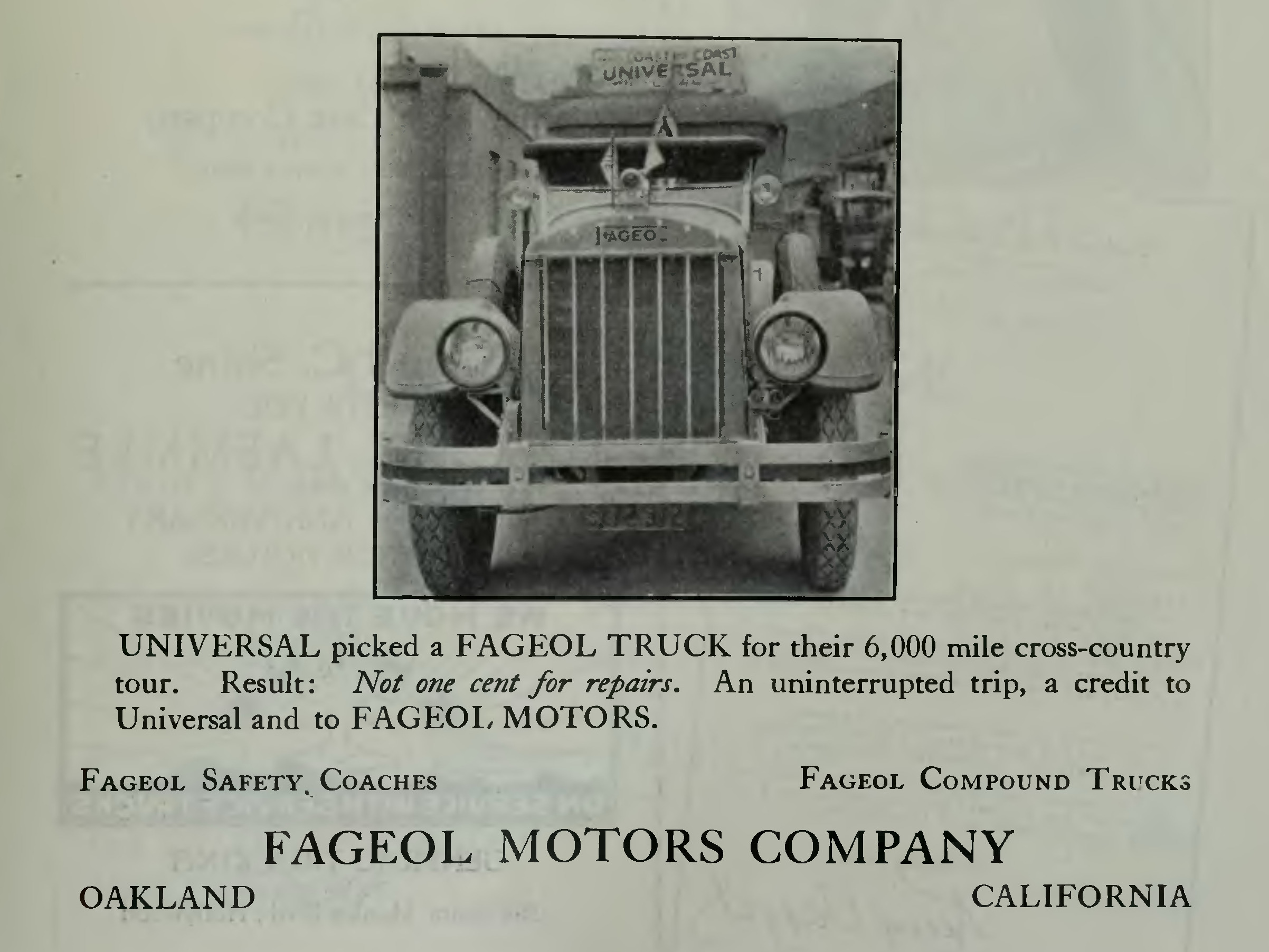
Fageol Motor Company truck ad in The Film Daily, 1926

Fageol produced tractors, buses and trucks, at least three luxury cars, as well as engines for land vehicles and ships. The company went through several stages, names, and location changes that included Fageol Motors Company, from 1915 to 1932 in Oakland, California; Fageol Motor Sales Company, from 1916 to 1932 in Oakland, California; Fageol Truck and Coach Company, from 1932 to 1938 in Oakland, California; Fageol Motors Company of Ohio, from 1920 to 1922 in Cleveland, Ohio and 1922 to 1926 in Kent, Ohio.

=== Tractors ===
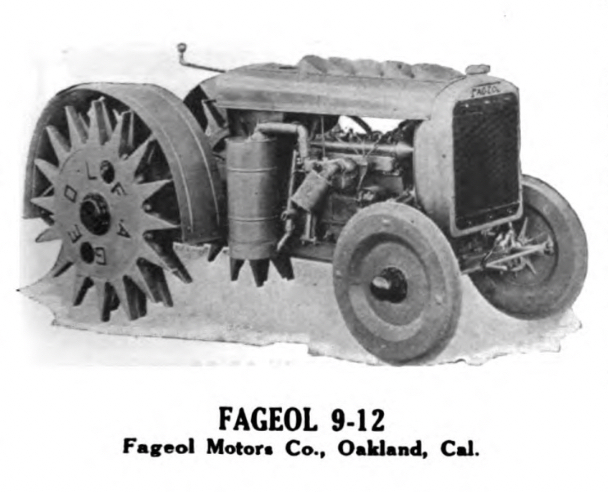
Fageol 9-12

The brothers had originally sold the Hamilton Walking Tractor, rebranded as the Fageol Walking Tractor, without much success. They were contracted to solve a transportation issue at the 1915 Panama Pacific Exposition. The fair covered over 600 acres, with two and a half miles of water front property. From February to December over 18 million people visited the fair. The solution provided by the brothers ended up being the Fageol Auto Train, also called the Trackless Train, powered with a Ford motor, pulling two or three low to the ground 20 passenger open-sided cars. The financial backer chose to use a different spelling, for ease of pronunciation, so the company was registered as The Fadgl Auto Train Inc.

This led to the founding of the Fageol Motors Company of Oakland. The company reached an agreement with Rush Hamilton of Geyserville, California to manufacture a tractor with spiked rear wheels.

=== Trucks ===
In 1950, the company manufactured a unique truck, the TC CargoLiner – touted as "A Trailer Without A Tractor". In 1953 the Twin Coach Company was awarded a patent for what would become the standard in straight truck design. The inventor was Louis J Fageol. The company produced 1 1/2-ton, 2 1/2-ton, 3 1/2-4 ton, and 5-6 ton trucks.

=== Cars ===
Since the founding of Fageol Motors Company, there had been a plan to build automobiles. Frank R. and William B. Fageol, with Louis H. Bill, built and marketed what was to be the most expensive luxury car of the time using the Hall-Scott aircraft engine. Marketed as the "Fageol Four Passenger Touring Speedster", only three were known to have been produced before the government took over the engine manufacturing plant to build war planes, ending production. Other cars built by the company were:

- Fageol 100
- Fageol Supersonic
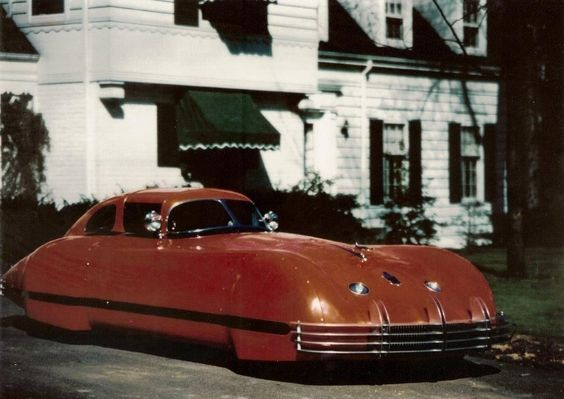
  Fageol Supersonic
- PataRay, also known as Fageol Special

=== Buses ===
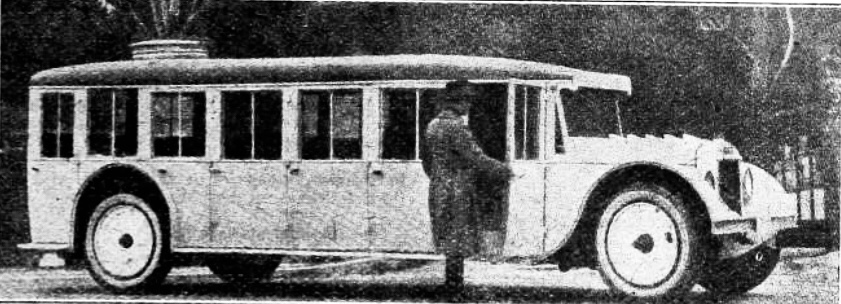
Fageol Omnibus (1922)

Fageol produced buses until 1953, when the bus-manufacturing portion of the Fageol Twin Coach Company was absorbed by Flxible.

- Twin Coach 44S co-manufactured with JG Brill Company and Twin Coach
- Safety Coach
- Cruising coach dubbed "America"
- Canopy covered double-decker "Sight-Seeing" bus
- Fageol Flyer
- Parlor Car
- Rear double-decker Parlor Car
- Super Twin (introduced in 1938) was a 14-ton 58-passenger diesel-electric that was hinged in the middle.
