= Cortez Motor Home =

American motor coach

Cortez Motorhome was a Class-A motor coach made in the United States between 1963 and 1979, with 3,211 units built.

The Clark Forklift Company began making these small motorhomes in 1963 in Battle Creek, Michigan, and are commonly referred to as Clark Cortez motorhomes. The entire body of a Class-A motor coaches is built as a recreational vehicle, whereas Class-B motorhome are built in a van body, and Class-C motorhomes add a recreational vehicle coach body to a truck chassis and cab.

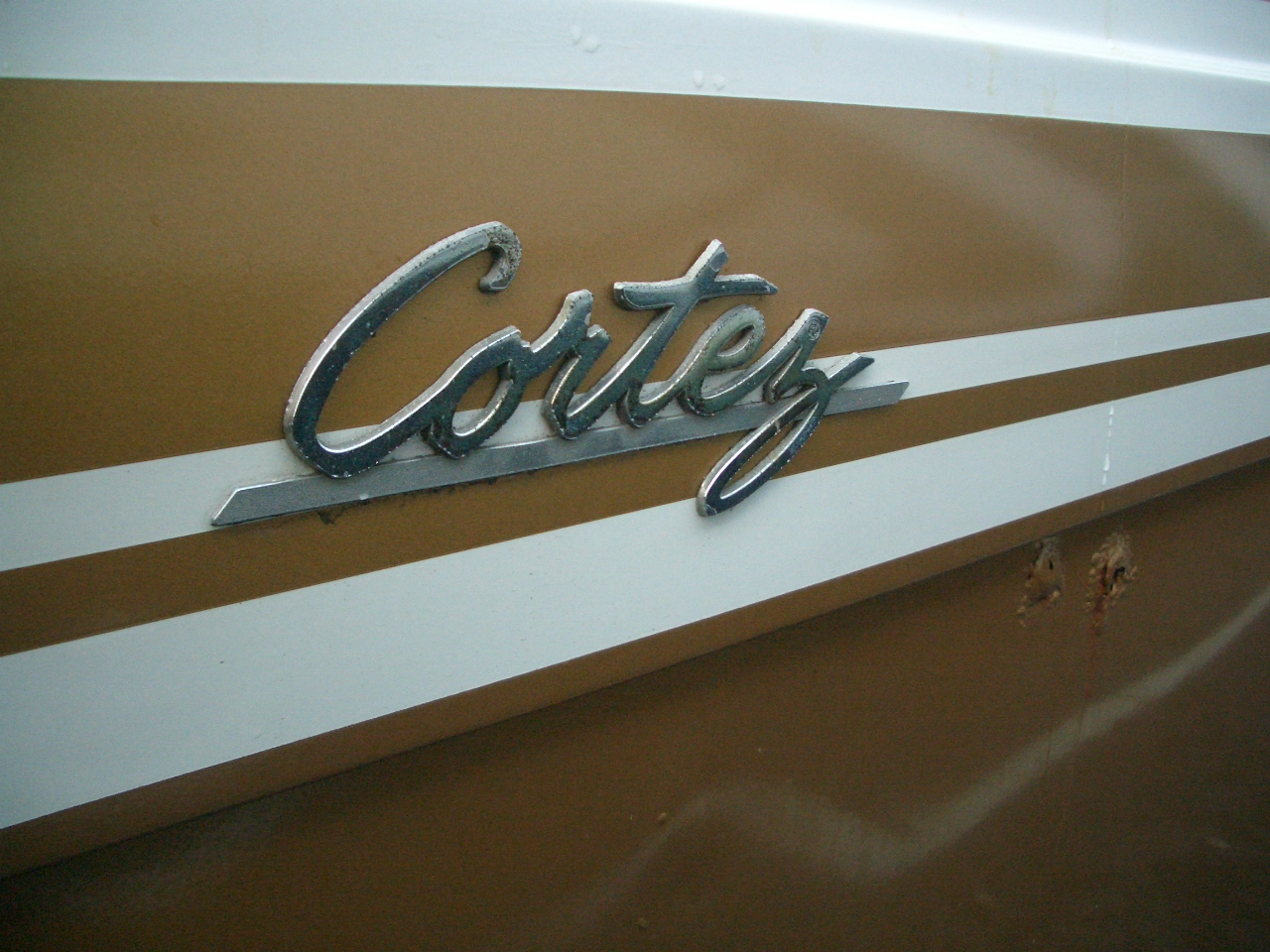
Emblem of a Cortez motorhome recreational vehicle.

A four speed manual front wheel drive transaxle was used to eliminate a driveshaft tunnel that would have increased height or diminished interior headroom.

Early units used a Chrysler 225ci industrial slant-6 engine. In 1969 a V-8 engine was introduced, using a Ford 302ci engine but still using the 4-speed manual transaxle. In 1971, the Oldsmobile Toronado front wheel transaxle with a 455ci engine in conjunction with a GM 3-speed automatic was used.

In 1970, Clark Forklift sold the Cortez Motorhome division to Alco-Standard's Kent Industries located in Kent, OH. The motorhomes produced from 1971 are commonly referred to as Kent Cortez motorhomes. In 1975, the company was acquired by 26 owners of Cortez coaches and production continued through 1978 when the company folded. A final batch of units were completed by a bank in 1979.

James Krantz purchased the tooling, spare parts, and a few unfinished units around 1980 and moved operations to Lafayette, La. There under the name Cortez Inc., he sold parts, performed service, and did robust drivetrain conversions to earlier model Clark Cortez units, converting them to the V8 automatic transaxle, similar to that found in 1970+ models. Operations ceased in Lafayette around 1990, with Krantz scrapping remaining parts and drawings by the late 1990s.

Clark management had envisioned a variety of uses for the Cortez. They were made as mobile offices, classrooms, and ambulances. NASA used a Cortez to take astronauts from Apollo 7 through STS-6 to the launch pad, which now resides in a museum at the Kennedy Space Center Visitor Center. Prior to being banned from practicing surgery in 1967, Walter Jackson Freeman II, inventor of the transorbital lobotomy, toured the United States in a Cortez from which he performed lobotomies. The vehicle would earn from the public the name of the "lobotomobile".

Cortez motorhome owners included Vincent Price, a devoted fan of this early motorhome. Cortez Motorhomes still enjoy a devoted following. Aficionados prefer its all-steel body despite rust issues, its smooth ride, and its moderate size.
