= Astronaut transfer van =

Vehicle used at the Kennedy Space Center

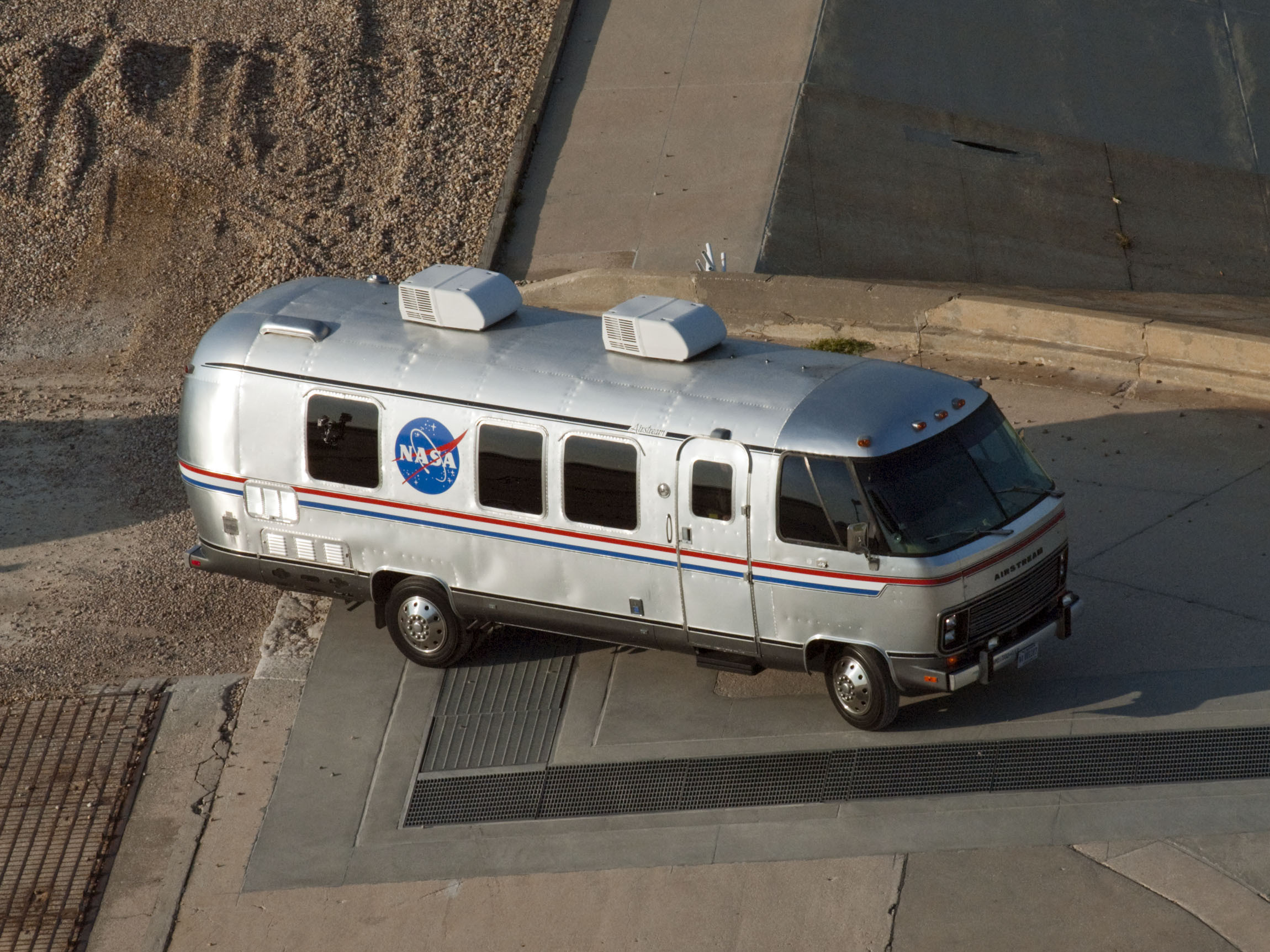
Shuttle-era Astrovan at Launch Pad 39A

The astronaut transfer van, known as the Astrovan during the Space Shuttle era, is a NASA vehicle used at the Kennedy Space Center to transport astronauts from the Operations and Checkout Building to the launch pad before a mission and for launch dress rehearsals, and back to the Operations and Checkout Building following a shuttle landing.

According to driver Ronnie King, the early shuttle astronauts liked the history-filled vehicle, even if it was somewhat old, and even argued against upgrading the vehicle. "We were staged to get a new one," King said, and added that word came that the rookie astronauts wanted to keep the vehicle that was a tradition of the astronauts who traveled those nine miles to the pad before them.

During the twenty-minute drive to the launch pad for shuttle launches, the Astrovan usually stopped at least once along the way. An astronaut rode with the crew and was let off near the Vehicle Assembly Building to board the Shuttle Training Aircraft and assess local weather conditions. Senior NASA managers occasionally rode along as well, and were dropped off at the Launch Control Center.

NASA has acquired a new, updated Astrovan for the Artemis Program from Airstream.

== Similar vehicles ==
- During Project Mercury a modified semi truck and trailer were used to transport astronauts to the launch pads LC-5 and LC-14.
- During Project Gemini a fleet of converted delivery vans were used to transport astronauts to the launch pad LC-19 (also used for the Apollo 1 crew).
- A modified Clark-Cortez motorhome was used to transport Apollo crews to the launch pad, beginning with Apollo 7 in 1967 and continuing through the Apollo–Soyuz launch in 1975. This vehicle remained in use through STS-6, and is now on display at the Kennedy Space Center Visitor Complex's Apollo/Saturn V Center.
- An Itasca Suncruiser M-22RB was used to transport the STS-7 and STS-8 astronauts to the launch pad, as the size of Space Shuttle crews had increased.
- A modified 1983 Airstream Excella motorhome, popularly known as the Astrovan, was used from STS-9 through the final Space Shuttle mission (STS-135), and is also on display at the KSC Visitor Center.
- On October 21, 2019, the Boeing Company and Airstream announced Astrovan II, a modified Airstream Atlas (with a Mercedes-Benz Sprinter chassis) touring coach to carry Boeing commercial crew astronauts to the launch pad where they will board the CST-100 Starliner on their way to the International Space Station. Astrovan II has seating for up to eight (including the driver), and was built at Airstream's Jackson Center, Ohio production facility.
- SpaceX does not use a van to transport astronauts for the SpaceX Dragon 2 missions, instead using a set of specially made Tesla Model X cars.
- On April 13, 2022, NASA announced that Canoo Technologies Inc would build three new crew transportation vehicles designed to take the fully suited astronauts, their support team, and their equipment on the nine-mile stretch of road from the Neil Armstrong Operations and Checkout Building to the launch pad for the Artemis program. In December 2025, NASA announced that, due to Canoo's January 2025 bankruptcy filings resulting in an inability for the company to meet mission requirements, they would not be using the Canoo vans for Artemis II and would instead lease the Astrovan II from Boeing, rewrapping it with NASA and Artemis branding.
- In Russia and China, cosmonauts and taikonauts have always relied on a bus to take them to the Launch Pad.

== Gallery ==
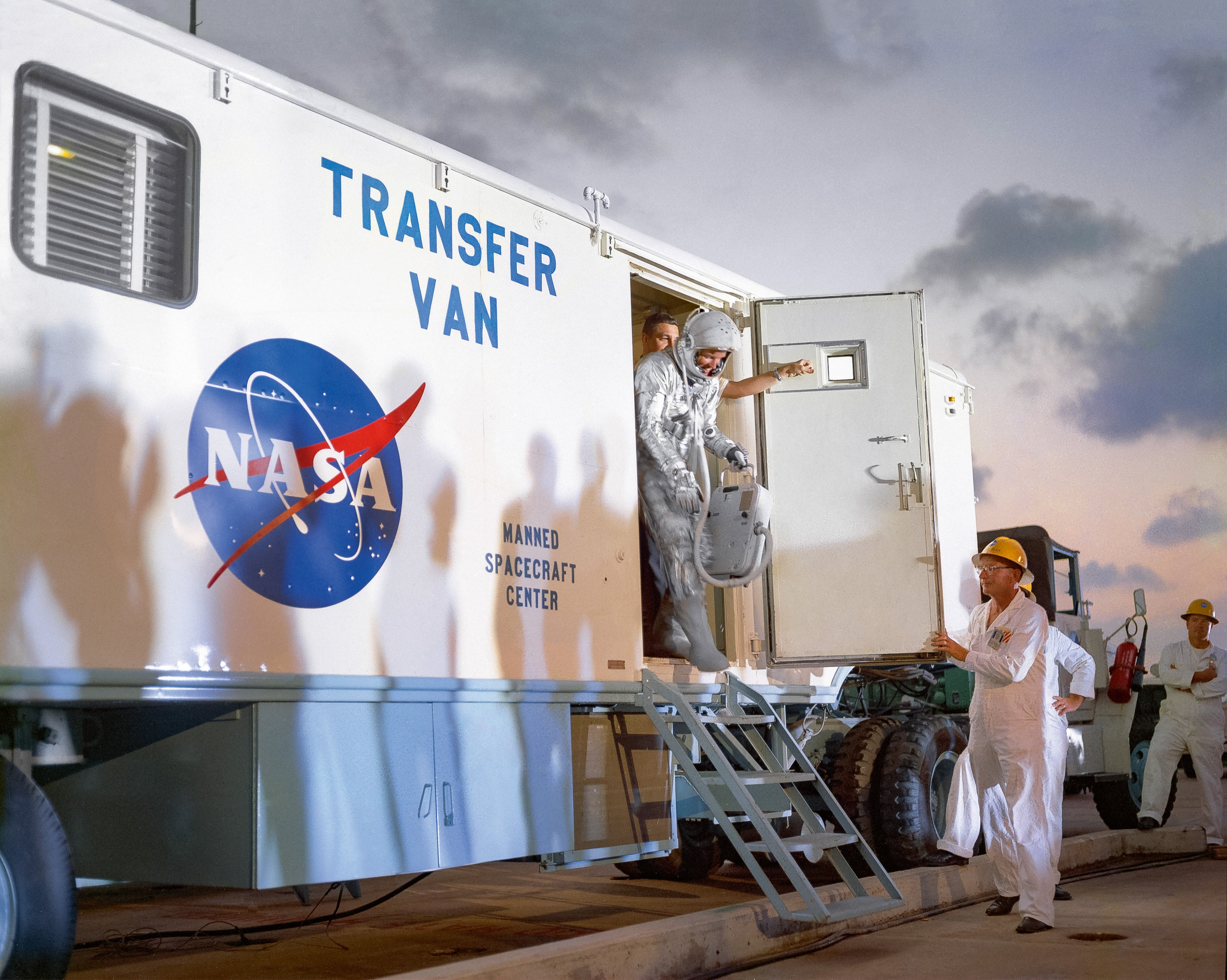
Mercury-era transfer van

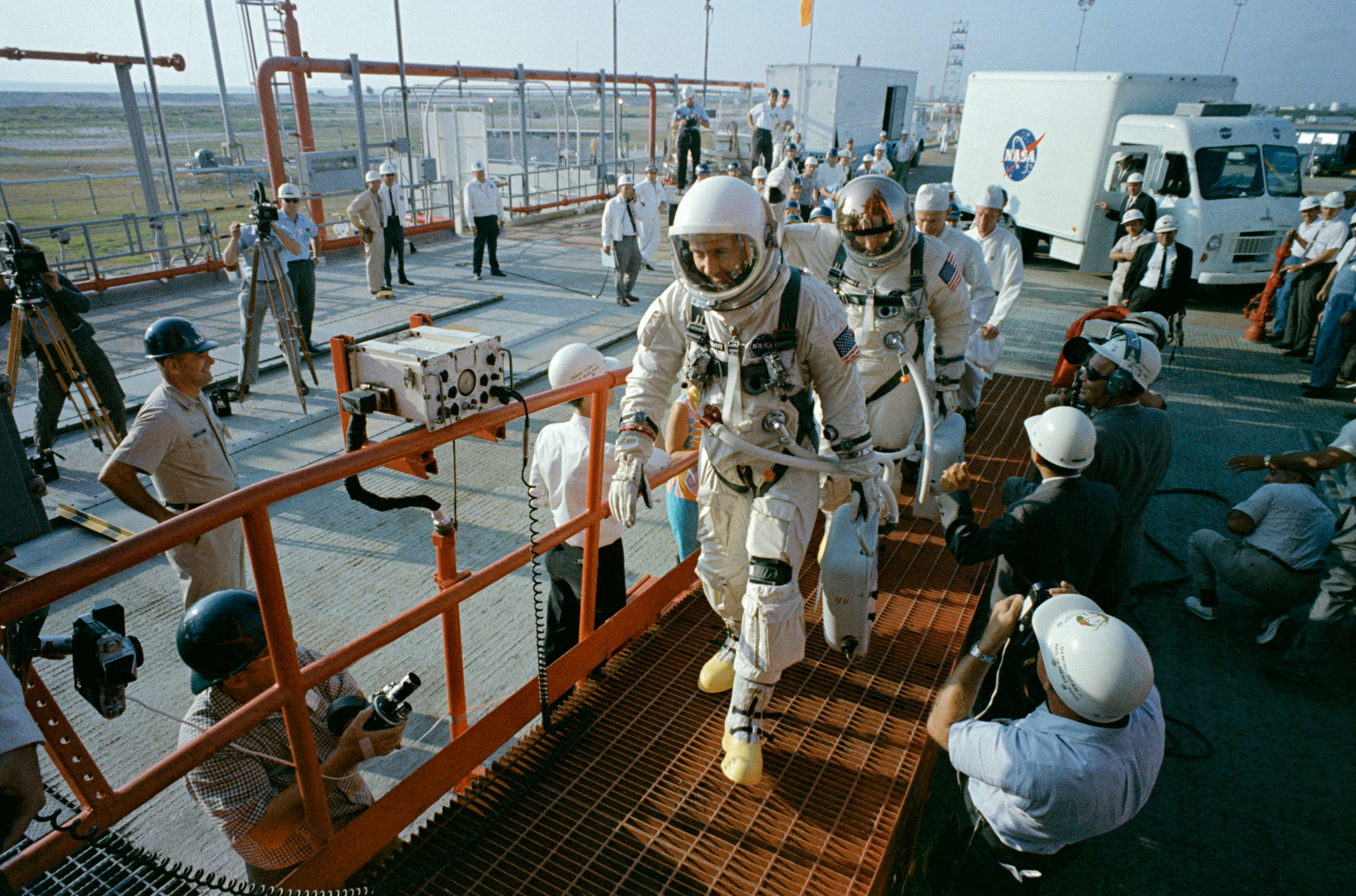
Gemini-era transfer van (in the background)

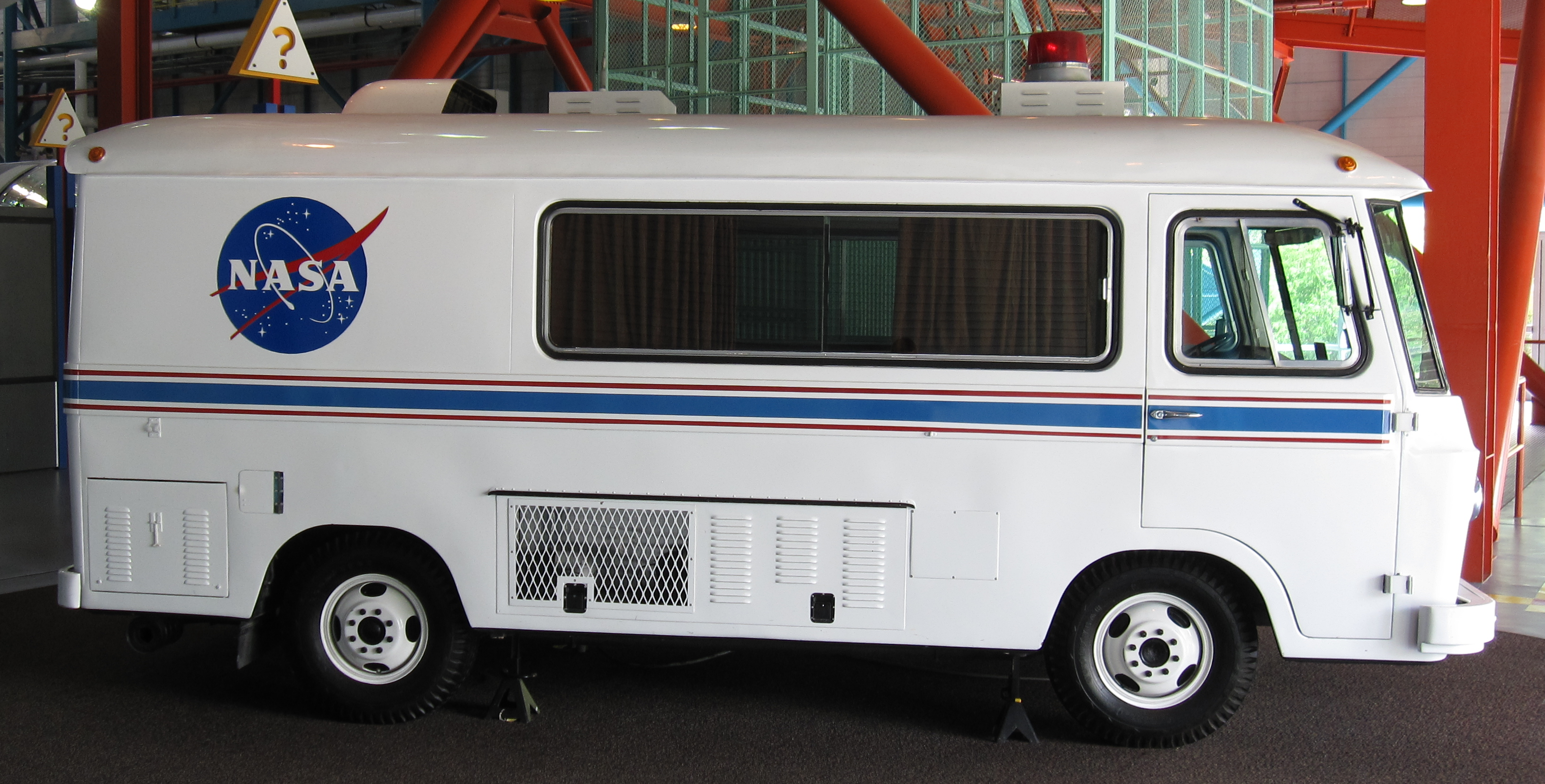
Apollo-era astronaut transfer van

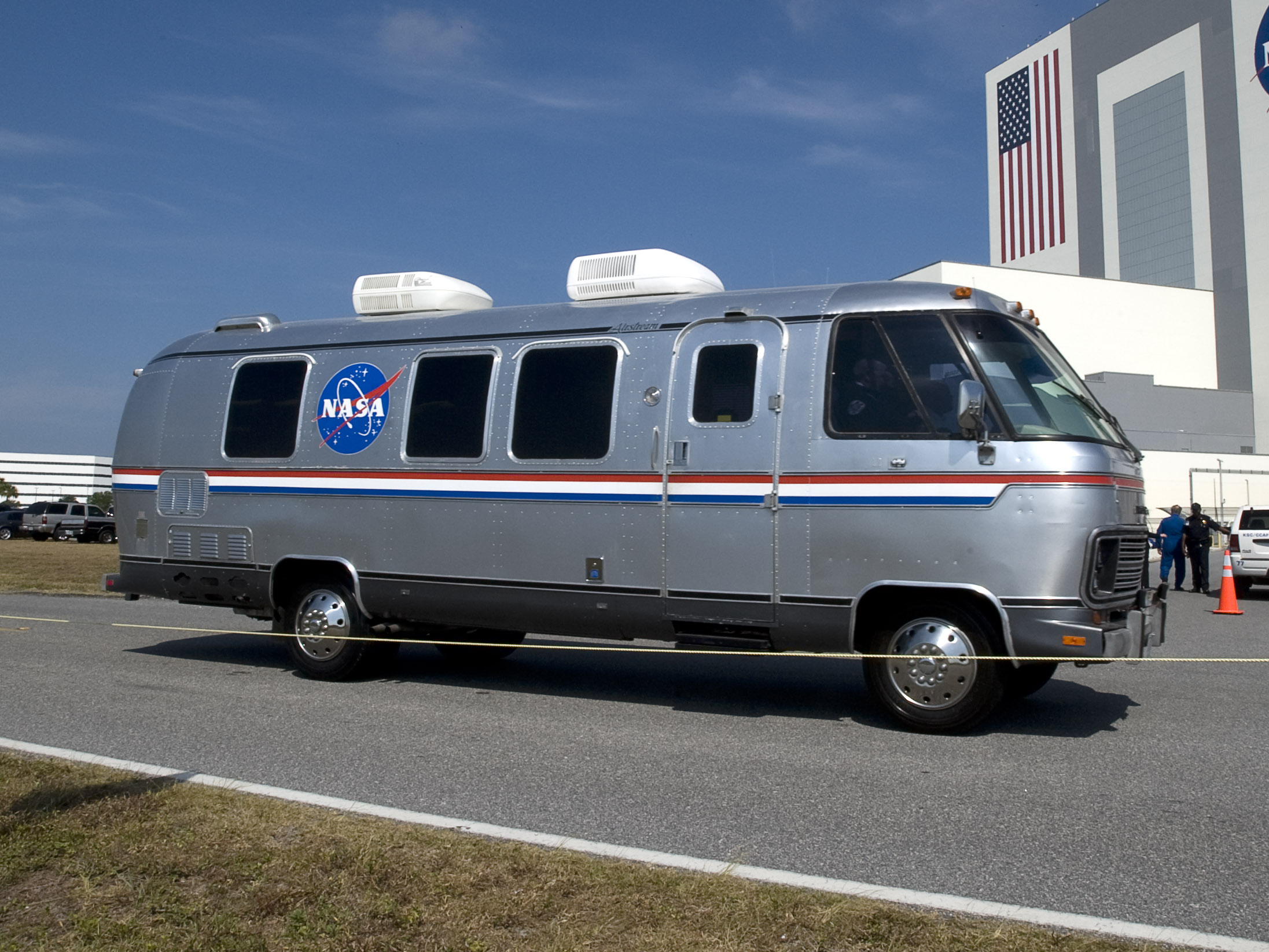
Shuttle-era Astrovan

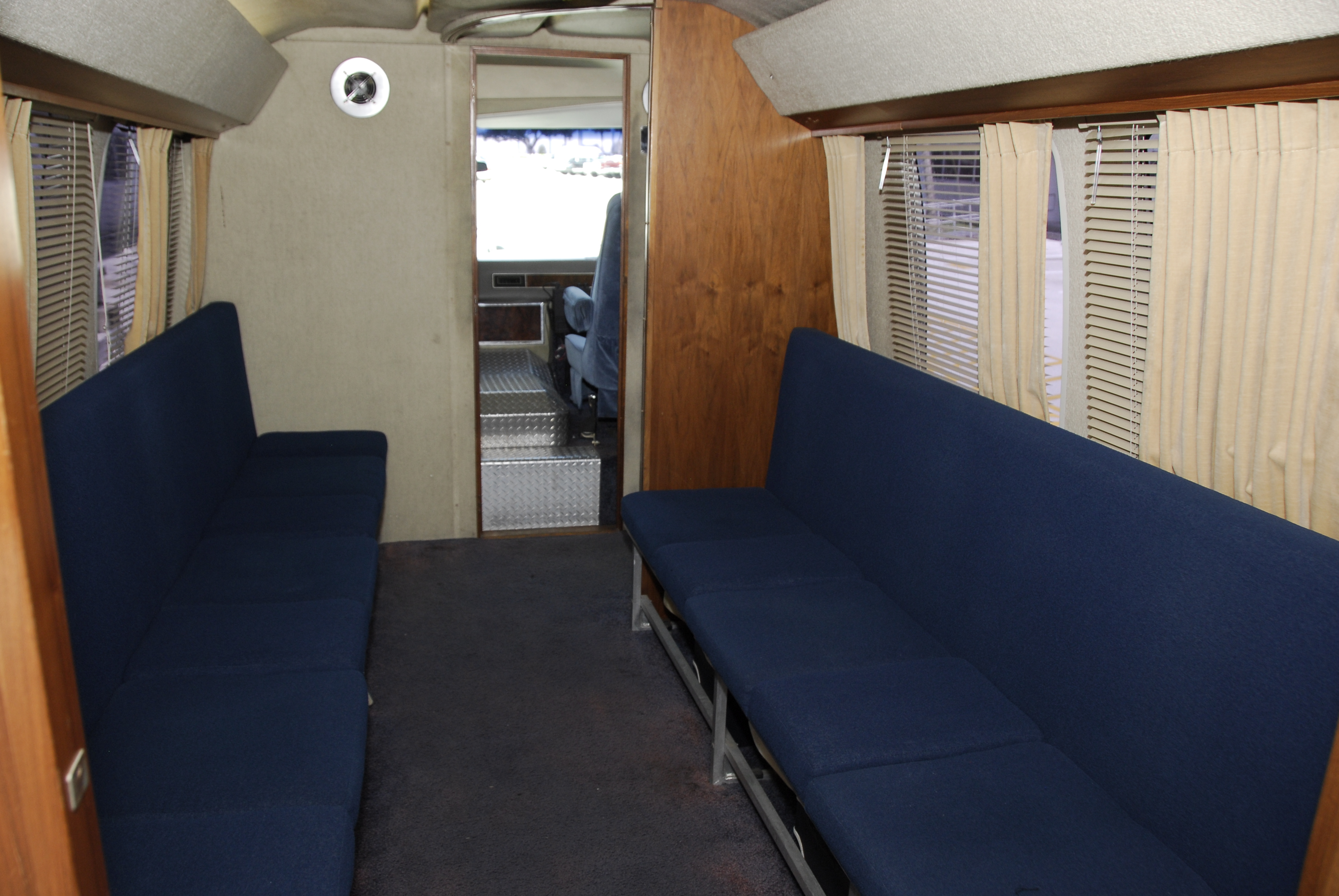
Shuttle-era Astrovan interior

== See also ==
- Space Shuttle
- Mobile quarantine facility
- NASA Crew Transport Vehicles
