= Allen Chen =

American aerospace engineer

Al Chen
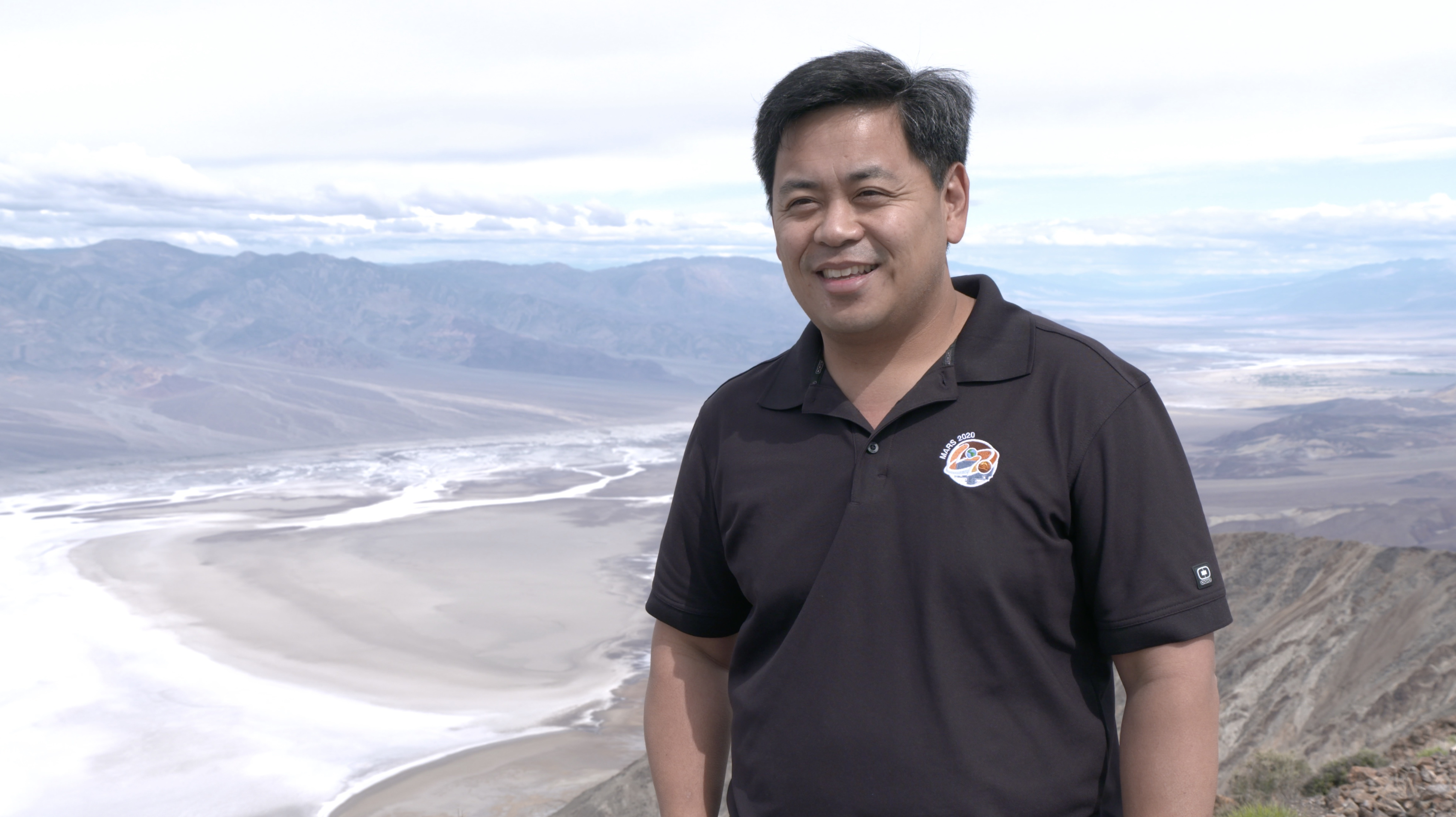
- Allen Chen at NASA JPL
- Education: Massachusetts Institute of Technology (S.B., S.M.); University of California Los Angeles (M.B.A.)
- Spouse: Julie Wertz Chen
- Scientific career
- Thesis: "Propulsion System Characterization for the SPHERES Formation Flight and Docking Testbed" (2002)
- Academic advisors: Dave Miller
- Engineering career
- Discipline: Systems Engineering
- Employer: NASA's Jet Propulsion Laboratory
- Projects: Mars Science Laboratory; Mars 2020

Allen "Al" Chen is an American aerospace engineer. He was the Entry, Descent, and Landing (EDL) Operations Lead on the Mars Science Laboratory mission and the EDL Lead for the Mars 2020 mission.

== Early life and education ==
Chen is from Newtown, Pennsylvania, and is a graduate of Lawrenceville School. He is a fan of the Philadelphia Eagles and Phillies teams.

He decided on the aerospace field during the spring of his freshman year at Massachusetts Institute of Technology. Chen was on the varsity fencing team, competing in the sabre. As a senior, he received the David J. Shapiro Memorial Award for building an electric-powered model aircraft with seven other students. He also received the James Means Memorial Award for Excellence in Flight Vehicle or Space Systems Engineering for his contributions to the SPHERES project in the "Conceive, Design, Implement and Operate" Capstone course.

In graduate school, he was in the Space Systems Laboratory (MIT) with Professor Dave Miller. He worked on propulsion system for the Synchronized Position Hold Engage and Reorient Experimental Satellite (SPHERES) project.

Chen received a Fully Employed Master of Business Administration (FEMBA) from the UCLA Anderson School of Management in 2007.

== Work at NASA ==
Allen Chen has worked at NASA's Jet Propulsion Laboratory in Pasadena, California for his entire career. He joined the Mars Science Laboratory EDL team in 2002. On August 5, 2012, Chen announced "Touchdown confirmed. We're safe on Mars!," after which the JPL Mission Control Center erupted in celebration; team members hugged, high fived, clapped and cried.

He was a member of the MSL EDL team to accept the National Air and Space Museum Trophy in person. He joined team members for a GQ profile.

Chen joined the Mars 2020 team in 2013, shortly after the team was assembled. In his EDL lead role, he was responsible for ensuring the spacecraft traveled safely from the top of the Martian atmosphere to landing in Jezero crater. The coronavirus pandemic broke out a year before the landing, so Chen had to lead his team while keeping socially distant and maintaining COVID-19 protocols.

Chen narrated the Mars 2020 landing procedures with Guidance and Controls Operations Lead Swati Mohan on February 18, 2021. Chen stated he's excited to be a part of bringing Martian samples back to Earth. He considers his Mars 2020 EDL team to be a second family to him.

== Selected publications ==
- Nelessen, Adam; Sackier, Chloe; Clark, Ian; Brugarolas, Paul; Villar, Gregorio; Chen, Allen; Stehura, Aaron; Otero, Richard; Stilley, Erisa; Way, David; Edquist, Karl; Mohan, Swati; Giovingo, Cj; Lefland, Mallory (March 2019). Mars 2020 Entry, Descent, and Landing System Overview. 2019 IEEE Aerospace Conference. Big Sky, Montana, USA: IEEE (published June 20, 2019). Bibcode:2019aero.conf...84N. doi:10.1109/AERO.2019.8742167. ISSN 1095-323X. S2CID 195221472.

== Personal life ==
Chen is married to NASA JPL systems engineer Julie Wertz Chen. They met at MIT and were both in the SPHERES Capstone class. Julie Wertz Chen was on the Mars InSight landing team and sat in the same front row seat that he did for Curiosity.

Chen has been active on social media since before the MSL landing.
