= Julie Wertz Chen =

American aerospace engineer

- Education: S.B., S.M, Ph.D. of Aeronautics & Astronautics Massachusetts Institute of Technology
- Spouse: Al Chen
- Scientific career
- Thesis: “Expected productivity-based risk analysis in conceptual design : with application to the Terrestrial Planet Finder Interferometer mission” (2006)
- Doctoral advisor: Dave Miller
- Engineering career
- Discipline: Systems Engineering
- Employer: NASA Jet Propulsion Laboratory
- Projects: InSight

Julie Wertz Chen is an American aerospace engineer. She has been a systems engineer for the Soil Moisture Active Passive (SMAP), Cassini, and InSight Mars missions. She is currently working on the Surface Water and Ocean Topography (SWOT) mission.

== Education ==
At Massachusetts Institute of Technology, Wertz Chen was on a coxswain on the varsity rowing team. She was involved in Sigma Gamma Tau and Tau Beta Pi. As a senior, she worked on the Synchronized Position Hold Engage and Reorient Experimental Satellite (SPHERES) project for the "Conceive, Design, Implement and Operate" Capstone course.

In graduate school, she was in the Space Systems Laboratory (MIT) with Professor Dave Miller. She researched design consideration of the probability of failure in the design of spacecraft for her doctoral thesis.

== Work at NASA ==
Wertz Chen has worked at NASA's Jet Propulsion Laboratory in Pasadena, California for her entire career. She has been the Fault Protection Verification and Validation lead for the SMAP mission, as well as a fault protection engineer on both the SMAP and Cassini missions. She was the team's systems engineer as well as the project verification and validation (V&V) lead engineer on the NASA InSight mission.

She is currently on the Project Systems Engineering Team for the SWOT project.

== Personal life ==
Wertz Chen is married to NASA JPL systems engineer Al Chen. They met at MIT and were both in the SPHERES Capstone class. Al Chen was on the Mars Science Laboratory landing team and sat in the same front row seat that she did for InSight landing team.
