= Mason Peck =

American academic and scientist

Mason Peck is an associate professor at Cornell University and former NASA Chief Technologist. His immediate predecessor in the NASA position was Bobby Braun.

Peck has published in various aerospace sub-disciplines including; air-bearing spacecraft simulation, low-power space robotics, hopping rovers, and Lorentz-augmented orbits.

Peck was awarded $75,000 in 2007 by NASA's Institute for Advanced Concepts (NIAC) to study how a large fleet of microchip-size space probes in Earth orbit might propel themselves into the Interplanetary Transport Network; and thence as far as Jupiter's moon Europa. This was to be achieved by exploiting the Lorentz Force, enabled by using photovoltaics to maintain an electrostatic charge while orbiting in Earth's magnetic field.

Peck has served on the advisory board of Mars One since February 2014.
