= Swati Mohan =

American aerospace engineer

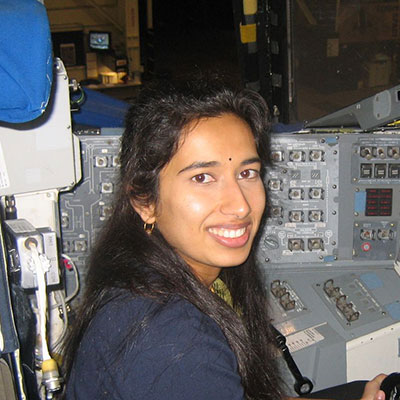
- Swati Mohan
- Education: Cornell University (B.S.); Massachusetts Institute of Technology (M.S., Ph.D.)
- Known for: Work on the Mars 2020 mission
- Scientific career
- Institutions: NASA's Jet Propulsion Laboratory
- Thesis: Quantitative Selection and Design of Model Generation Architectures for On-Orbit Autonomous Assembly (2010)
- Doctoral advisor: Dave Miller

Swati Mohan is an Indian-American aerospace engineer and was the Guidance and Controls Operations Lead on the NASA Mars 2020 mission.

== Early life and education ==
Mohan was born in Bengaluru, Karnataka, India, and emigrated to the United States when she was one year old. She became interested in space upon seeing Star Trek at age 9. She had originally planned to be a pediatrician but at the age of 16 took a physics class and decided to study engineering as a way to pursue a career in space exploration. She studied Mechanical and Aerospace Engineering at Cornell University, before completing her master's degree and Ph.D. in Aeronautics and Astronautics at Massachusetts Institute of Technology.

She researched on-orbit operations in the Space Systems Laboratory (MIT) with Professor Dave Miller. She worked with the Synchronized Position Hold Engage and Reorient Experimental Satellite (SPHERES), SWARM, and ALMOST testbeds. With SPHERES, she had multiple tests performed on the International Space Station (ISS), including some by fellow MIT alumni astronauts Dan Tani and Greg Chamitoff. She also worked on the SPHERES Zero Robotics competition for middle and high school students.

At MIT, she was involved in the Graduate Student Council, Sidney-Pacific Residence Hall (including Sidney-Pacific Intercultural Exchange (SPICE)), and Graduate Association of Aeronautics and Astronautics (GA^3) student organizations.

== Work at NASA ==
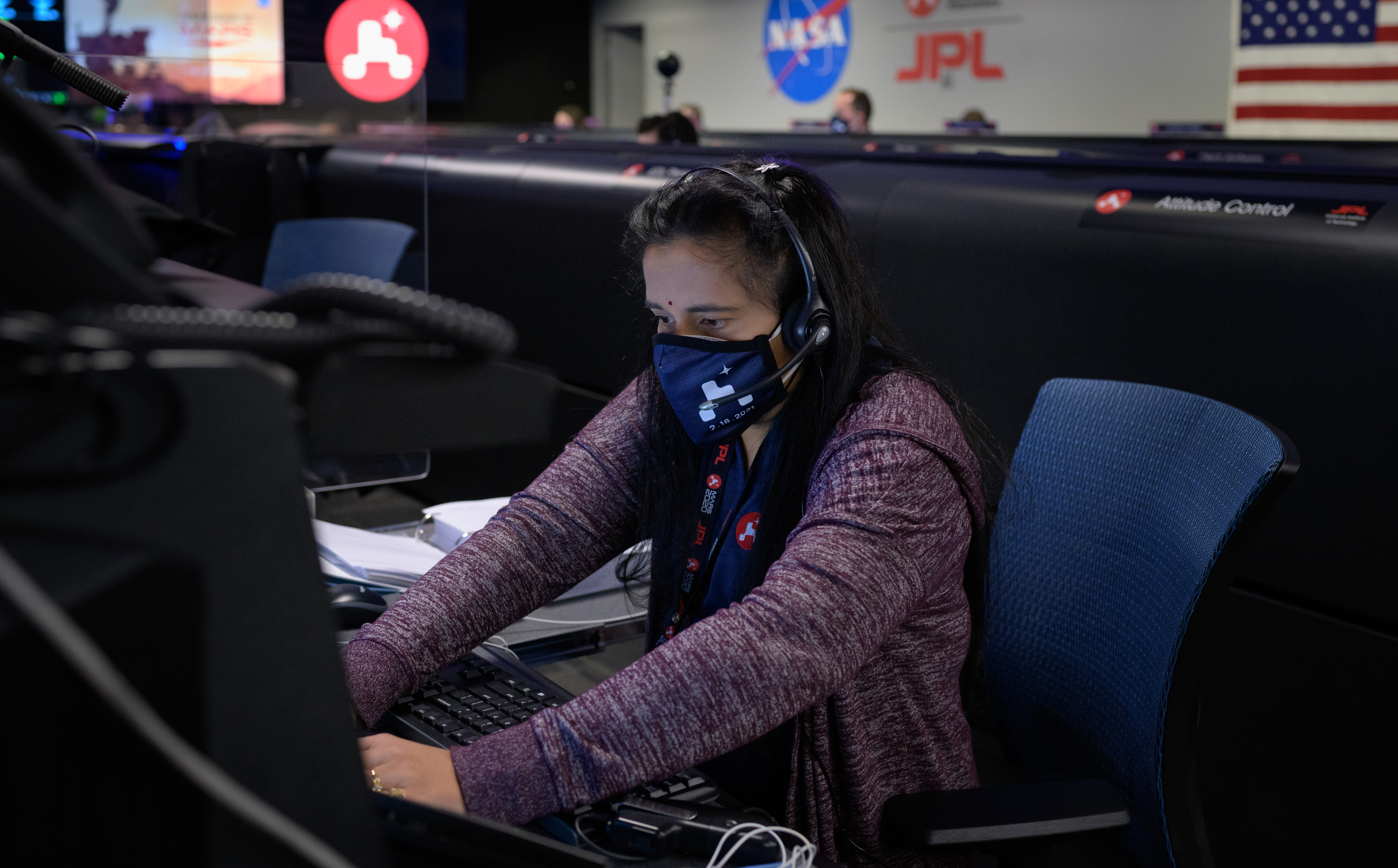
Mohan studies monitors in mission control on 18 February 2021, at NASA's Jet Propulsion Laboratory in Pasadena, California

Mohan works at NASA's Jet Propulsion Laboratory in Pasadena, California, and is the Guidance & Controls Operations Lead for the Mars 2020 mission. Mohan joined the Mars 2020 team in 2013, shortly after the team was assembled. In her role, she was responsible for ensuring the spacecraft that carries the rover was properly oriented during its travel to Mars and when landing on the planet's surface. She narrated the landing events from inside mission control as the Perseverance rover landed on Mars on 18 February 2021. She announced "Touchdown is confirmed," after which the JPL Mission Control Center erupted in celebration, clapping and fist bumping (socially distant due to COVID-19).

Mohan explained the navigation system during the landing: "Perseverance will be the first mission to use Terrain-Relative Navigation. While it’s descending on the parachute, it will actually be taking images of the surface of Mars and determining where to go based on what it sees. This is finally like landing with your eyes open — having this new technology really allows Perseverance to land in much more challenging terrain than Curiosity, or any previous Mars mission, could."

Previously, she had worked on the Cassini mission to Saturn, and GRAIL, a pair of small spacecraft which mapped the gravitational field of the Moon.

== Selected publications ==
- Babuscia, Alessandra; Van de Loo, Mark; Wei, Quantum J.; Pan, Serena; Mohan, Swati; Seager, Sara (2014). "Inflatable antenna for cubesat: fabrication, deployment and results of experimental tests". 2014 IEEE Aerospace Conference. Big Sky, MT: IEEE: 1–12.
- Mohan, Swati; Miller, David (18 August 2008). "SPHERES Reconfigurable Control Allocation for Autonomous Assembly". AIAA Guidance, Navigation and Control Conference and Exhibit. Honolulu, Hawaii: American Institute of Aeronautics and Astronautics.
- Scharf, Daniel P.; Regehr, Martin W.; Vaughan, Geoffery M.; Benito, Joel; Ansari, Homayoon; Aung, MiMi; Johnson, Andrew; Casoliva, Jordi; Mohan, Swati; Dueri, Daniel; Acikmese, Behcet (2014-03). "ADAPT demonstrations of onboard large-divert Guidance with a VTVL rocket". 2014 IEEE Aerospace Conference. Big Sky, MT, USA: IEEE: 1–18.
- Mohan, Swati; Miller, David (10 August 2009). "SPHERES Reconfigurable Framework and Control System Design for Autonomous Assembly". AIAA Guidance, Navigation, and Control Conference. Chicago, Illinois: American Institute of Aeronautics and Astronautics.
- Mohan, Swati; Miller, David W. (2014-09). "Dynamic Control Model Calculation: A Model Generation Architecture for Autonomous On-Orbit Assembly". Journal of Spacecraft and Rockets. 51 (5): 1430–1453.

== Family ==
Mohan is married to Santhosh Nadipuram, a pediatric infectious disease physician and research scientist at Cedars-Sinai in Los Angeles and clinical instructor in pediatric infectious disease at David Geffen School of Medicine at UCLA. Mohan and Nadipuram have two daughters, one of whom was born after Mohan began working on the Mars 2020 project in 2013.
