= Maruthi Akella =

Indian-American aerospace engineer

- Born: 1972 (age 53–54); India
- Citizenship: United States of America
- Title: Professor, Cockrell Family Chair in Engineering #19
- Awards: See list

Academic background
- Education: B.Tech. (Honors), 1992, National Institute of Technology Calicut; M.E. (with Distinction), 1994, Indian Institute of Science; Ph.D., 1998, Texas A&M University
- Alma mater: Texas A&M University
- Thesis: Structured adaptive control: theory and applications to trajectory tracking in aerospace systems (1998)
- Doctoral advisor: John Junkins

Academic work
- Discipline: Aerospace Engineering
- Sub-discipline: Astrodynamics, Learning and Adaptive Systems, Space Vehicle Guidance and Control
- Institutions: Cockrell School of Engineering, University of Texas at Austin
- Website: https://www.ae.utexas.edu/people/faculty/faculty-directory/akella

Maruthi Ram Akella (born 1972) is an Indian-American aerospace engineer. Akella specializes in the control of complex dynamical systems that are subject to large scale nonlinearities and uncertainties.

== Early life and education ==
Akella was born in 1972. He received his B.Tech. degree in Mechanical Engineering from the National Institute of Technology, Calicut and his M.E. degree in aerospace engineering from the Indian Institute of Science in 1994 and later received his Ph.D. degree in aerospace engineering from Texas A&M University in 1998. He was advised by John Junkins.

Akella was later recognized by Texas A&M Aerospace Alumni Academy as an Outstanding Young Aerospace Engineer in 2015 and the Distinguished Alumni Award from the National Institute of Technology, Calicut in 2023.

== Career ==
Upon completing his formal education and a post doctoral appointment at Yale University with Kumpati S. Narendra, Akella joined the faculty of the Department of Aerospace Engineering and Engineering Mechanics, Cockrell School of Engineering at The University of Texas at Austin in 1999. Early in his academic career, he studied hummingbird flight kinematics and their inspiration for agile micro-air vehicles. He made fundamental contributions to spacecraft attitude tracking control without making use of rate-gyros, and thus significantly reducing the number of sensors that are required to track any rotating space object. The gyro-free attitude controllers were successfully implemented onboard a pair of spacecraft as part of the European Union's QB50 mission to provide multi-point measurements of the mid-lower thermosphere, located between the 200-400 km altitude range.

Akella's current research encompasses control theoretic investigations and experimental validation of a wide variety of complex engineered dynamical systems that include autonomous space vehicles and robotics; cislunar astrodynamics; flow-control systems for high-speed and hypersonic vehicles; miniature robots navigating inside GPS-denied environments; uncertainty quantification; and cooperative control, learning, and collaborative sensing problems in swarm robots. The control algorithms provided by Akella and his students have been validated and successfully employed within flight applications, most notably through NASA’s Seeker (spacecraft) and the Waverider X-51 scramjet unmanned experimental research program. His research group contributed for the onboard guidance algorithm for the Intuitive Machines IM-1 mission in 2024 – the first U.S. moon landing in more than 50 years since the Apollo era.

For his far-reaching theoretical contributions and practical advances in aerospace guidance, navigation and control, particularly nonlinear attitude estimation and control, Akella was recognized with several prestigious awards including the American Institute of Aeronautics and Astronautics (AIAA) Mechanics and Control of Flight Award, the American Astronautical Society (AAS) Dirk Brouwer Award, the Institute of Electrical and Electronics Engineers (IEEE) Control Systems Society Award for Technical Excellence in Aerospace Control, and the IEEE Judith A. Resnik Space Award. During 2021-2022, Akella served as the Technology lead facilitator for the Urban Air Mobility Advisory Committee established by the Texas State Legislature tasked to assess current state law and provide necessary recommendations for facilitating air mobility operations and infrastructure within the state.

In 2019, Akella was named Editor-in-Chief for The Journal of the Astronautical Sciences. He serves on the editorial board for the AIAA Journal of Guidance, Control, and Dynamics and an elected member on the Board of Directors for the American Astronautical Society. During 2016-19, he served as an IEEE Distinguished Lecturer for the Aerospace and Electronic Systems Society -- a recognition given to “engineering professionals who help lead their fields in new technical developments that shape the global community.”

Akella is a Fellow of the AIAA, IEEE, and AAS and holds the Academician rank with the International Academy of Astronautics. During October 2024, the International Astronomical Union (IAU) Working Group for Small Bodies Nomenclature designated asteroid number 5376 – a nearly 5-mile diameter-sized minor planet from the main asteroid belt – as “Maruthiakella” honoring Akella’s contributions to “many successful applications in astrodynamics.” In March 2025, Akella was awarded a VAIBHAV Fellowship from the Government of India Ministry of Science and Technology as the first ever honoree to receive this recognition in the aerospace technologies field. Under this flagship VAIBHAV program, he is tasked with building a collaborative network of researchers working on programs aligned with India’s aerospace research priorities, and exchange practices between the India and the U.S., as well as strive to address opportunities for technology commercialization.

== Awards and honors ==
- 2013 Fellow, AAS
- 2014 Mechanics and Control of Flight Award, AIAA
- 2015 Judith A. Resnik Space Award, IEEE
- 2020 IEEE-CSS Aerospace Excellence Award
- 2020 Dirk Brouwer Award, AAS
- 2022 Fellow, IEEE
- 2022 Fellow, AIAA
- 2025 VAIBHAV Fellow, Government of India, Department of Science and Technology
