= Ali Guarneros Luna =

Mexican Aerospace engineer

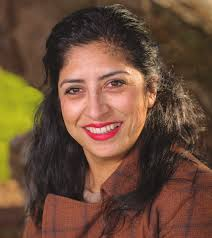
- Born: 1973 (age 52–53); Mexico City, Mexico
- Education: San Jose City College, San Jose State University
- Scientific career
- Fields: Aerospace engineering
- Workplaces: National Aeronautics and Space Administration (NASA), San Jose State University

Ali Guarneros Luna (born 1973) is a Mexican aerospace engineer at National Aeronautics and Space Administration (NASA). Luna is a professor at San Jose State University and dedicates her time mentoring the youth. She is best known for her work in designing cost efficient miniature satellites and leads many satellite projects for NASA.

== Early life and education ==
Luna was born in Mexico City in 1973 and lived in Coyoacán until 1988. She migrated from Mexico to the U.S. state of California at the age of fourteen after Luna and her family experienced the 1985 Mexico City earthquake. At the age of eighteen while attending high school, Luna's mother was laid off, and Luna became the sole financial support.

Luna, a parent of four, two with special needs, made the decision to return to school. Luna states her passion for Aerospace flourished when she found a chapter on a space mission in a book a bookseller sold her family at the age of seven. Luna attended San Jose City College and received her Associate of Science degree in Aerospace.

Luna attended San Jose State University where she studied aerospace engineering. While attending SJSU she was approached by one of her professors about an internship opportunity at NASA. Luna graduated from San Jose State University with a Bachelor of Science and her master's degree in aerospace engineering then began her intern position at NASA.

== Career and research ==
Luna was an intern at NASA's Ames Research Center in Mountain View and worked with the center's Chief of Technology. She was a lead for safety certification and tests that certified equipment for flight and focused on developing affordable technology.

Luna became a professor at San Jose State University for aerospace engineering and encourages more minorities and women to pursue the field of engineering. She also offers her students opportunities to tour NASA and creates internships for minorities.

Luna and the Mars Reconnaissance Orbiter (MRO) team are working to learn about an area on Mars called Hellas Planitia. Luna and the MRO team are studying the occurrences of sandstorms on Hellas Planitia.

At NASA's Ames Research Center, Luna held various positions and worked on a variety of projects. Luna was the Mission Manager of the Technology Education Satellite, (TechEdSat). Luna was also the Deputy Manager for Network & Operation Demonstration Satellite (NODES). She held the position of System Engineer for Synchronized Position Hold, Engage, Reorient, Experimental Satellites (SPHERES). As a part of the SPHERES Engineering team, she helped scientists, companies, and government institutions have access to advanced robot platform technologies that could be found on the International Space Station (ISS) and the TechEdSat.

Luna holds the position of aerospace engineer for the Small Satellite Technology Program (SSTP) at The Space Technology Mission Directorate (STMD) where she manages the Tipping Points program. Her work is primarily focused on satellites.

== Awards and honors ==
In October 2013, the Hispanic Engineering National Achievement Awards Conference (HENAAC) named Luna a Luminary Honoree which is given to Hispanic leaders and symbols in high STEM academia.

The office of the International Space Station (ISS) gave Luna the ISS Space Award in October 2013 for her work in SPHERES, MRMSS, NODES, and the TechEdSat Series.

Luna was given the NASA Honor Award – Equal Employment Opportunity Medal for her achievement and work in projects like SPHERES, MRMSS, NODES, and research on the Hellas Planitia.

In February 2018, Luna was presented the 2017 Space Technology Award for the Project Nodes. Luna was recognized for her performance in the development of nanosatellites. Later in May 2018, Luna also received her first international recognition: the Ohtli Award for her positive impact on Mexican citizens and many others internationally. In October that same year, Luna also was awarded the Women of Color (WOC) Outstanding Technical Contribution in Government Award.

In 2019, Luna was awarded the HENAAC award for Most Promising Scientist or Engineer - Master's by the organization Great Minds in STEM.

== Current role and responsibilities ==
As of 2023, Ali Guarneros Luna serves as a senior aerospace engineer at NASA's Ames Research Center. In this career, she supports the Small Satellite Technology Program (SSTP) within the Space Technology Mission Directorate (STMD), managing initiatives like the Tipping Points program and overseeing various small satellite projects. She is also currently working with the SOAREX Series team as a developer.
