= EMFF =

EMFF may refer to:

- Electromagnetic formation flight
- the European Maritime and Fisheries Fund, a previous name of the European Maritime, Fisheries and Aquaculture Fund
