= Hagler Institute for Advanced Study =

- Named after: Jon L. Hagler
- Formation: December 2010; 15 years ago
- Founder: John L. Junkins
- Type: University research institute
- Purpose: Interdisciplinary research and graduate education
- Headquarters: College Station, Texas, United States
- Parent organization: Texas A&M University
- Website: hias.tamu.edu
- Formerly called: Texas A&M University Institute for Advanced Study

The Hagler Institute for Advanced Study at Texas A&M University (HIAS), formerly the Texas A&M University Institute for Advanced Study (TIAS), is an interdisciplinary research institute at Texas A&M University in College Station, Texas. Established in December 2010 and launched in 2011, the institute recruits internationally recognized scholars and other distinguished professionals for visiting appointments during which they collaborate with university faculty and graduate students. Its activities encompass science, engineering, medicine, agriculture, business, the humanities, and the arts.

The institute was founded by John L. Junkins, a University Distinguished Professor of aerospace engineering at Texas A&M. It was renamed in 2017 following a $20 million endowment commitment from Texas A&M alumnus and philanthropist Jon L. Hagler. In addition to its visiting scholar program, the institute administers the Chancellor's National Academy STEM Ph.D. Fellowship Program, which supports doctoral students working with national academy members and Texas A&M faculty.

== History and establishment ==
The Hagler Institute originated from an initiative led by John L. Junkins to increase research collaboration between Texas A&M faculty and internationally distinguished scholars. The Texas A&M University System Board of Regents established the institute in December 2010, and Junkins worked with university administrators to launch operations in 2011.

The institute received an initial five-year funding commitment of $5.2 million from the Texas A&M University System under Chancellor John Sharp. It welcomed its first class of six visiting scholars during the 2012–2013 academic year.

Originally known as the Texas A&M University Institute for Advanced Study, it was renamed in February 2017 following a $20 million commitment from Jon L. Hagler, a 1958 Texas A&M graduate. The commitment established an endowment intended to provide long-term financial support for visiting scholars and their collaborations with university faculty and students.

== The first fifteen classes (2012–2027) ==
The institute selected its first fifteen classes of distinguished scholars between the 2012–2013 and 2026–2027 academic years. The inaugural class included six fellows, among them Nobel laureate Vernon L. Smith, materials scientist Alan Needleman, and environmental scientist Peter Liss. Subsequent classes included scholars recognized for contributions to the natural sciences, engineering, medicine, agriculture, social sciences, humanities, business, and other disciplines. Participants have included Nobel laureates, recipients of the National Medal of Science and National Medal of Technology and Innovation, and members of national and international academies.

The institute's growth was reflected in the size and disciplinary breadth of its annual classes. The 2024–2025 class included nineteen Hagler Fellows and one Distinguished Lecturer, the largest annual cohort to that date. The 2025–2026 class comprised eleven fellows and two Distinguished Lecturers. By the announcement of its fifteenth class in October 2026, the institute had selected a cumulative total of 172 scholars, including 156 Hagler Fellows and 16 Distinguished Lecturers. Seventeen of these scholars had subsequently joined Texas A&M's permanent faculty.

A notable appointment in the 2025–2026 class was four-time Grammy Award-winning singer-songwriter, actor, and Texas A&M alumnus Lyle Lovett. Lovett became the institute's first performing artist appointed as a Hagler Fellow. As of October 2026, he was serving his residency with the university's College of Performance, Visualization and Fine Arts, working with music and theatre students and faculty. In October 2026, Lovett was inducted into the Nashville Songwriters Hall of Fame.

The fifteenth class, announced for 2026–2027, included ten Hagler Fellows and one Distinguished Lecturer. Its members included climate scientist Myles Allen, chemical engineer Kristi Anseth, physicist Jun Ye, primatologist Patricia C. Wright, and neuroscientist Amita Sehgal, who was appointed Distinguished Lecturer. The class also included researchers in medicine, education, accounting, transportation, agriculture, and other fields.

== Hagler Fellows ==
Hagler Fellows are visiting scholars selected for significant professional accomplishments and international recognition within their respective disciplines. Candidates are nominated through Texas A&M's academic colleges, schools, and research institutes, with the approval of the relevant academic leadership. Nominees are evaluated by a Faculty Advisory Board composed of University Distinguished Professors. Candidates are generally expected to hold membership in a national academy or possess comparable professional distinctions.

Appointments ordinarily range from three to twelve months and may be distributed over several years, allowing fellows to develop sustained collaborations with Texas A&M faculty and students. Fellows are affiliated with the academic units that nominated them and may participate in research projects, graduate mentorship, scholarly seminars, and public lectures. The institute also appoints Distinguished Lecturers, who participate in shorter scholarly engagements.

== Graduate fellowships and mentorship ==
Graduate student development is a component of the institute's academic program. Hagler Fellows collaborate with Texas A&M graduate students through research projects and mentorship arrangements coordinated with faculty hosts. The institute's fellowship model connects visiting scholars with university researchers and graduate students working in related areas.

The institute provides support for graduate students associated with Hagler Fellows, including opportunities for research collaboration and professional development. Its funding model includes donor-supported graduate fellowships and endowments intended to sustain these activities.

== Chancellor's National Academy STEM Ph.D. Fellowship Program ==
The Chancellor's National Academy STEM Ph.D. Fellowship Program is a doctoral fellowship initiative administered by the Hagler Institute for Advanced Study and funded by the Chancellor of the Texas A&M University System. Established in 2024, the program supports graduate students pursuing doctoral degrees in science, technology, engineering, and mathematics (STEM). It extends the institute's graduate education activities by connecting doctoral students with members of national academies and Texas A&M faculty.

The program follows a collaborative mentorship model involving a doctoral student, a member of a national academy, and a Texas A&M faculty member. Participating academy members may belong to the National Academy of Sciences, National Academy of Engineering, National Academy of Medicine, or American Academy of Arts and Sciences. The academy member may serve as the student's dissertation committee chair, co-chair, or committee member.

The inaugural group of fifteen Chancellor's Fellows began doctoral studies in fall 2025. The program's published fellowship terms for students beginning in fall 2027 provide a $40,000 annual stipend, tuition and fees, and student health insurance for four years. Participating fields include aerospace engineering, biomedical engineering, chemistry, genetics, materials science, nuclear engineering, physics, nutrition, and translational medical sciences.

The program uses a mentorship structure similar to the institute's broader collaborative model, pairing established researchers with developing faculty and graduate students. Unlike graduate fellowships associated with visiting Hagler scholars, the Chancellor's Fellowship supports doctoral students pursuing degree programs at Texas A&M under the supervision of participating faculty and national academy members.

== Faculty hosts and research collaboration ==
Each Hagler Fellow is associated with one or more Texas A&M faculty hosts who coordinate the fellow's academic activities and facilitate research collaboration. Hosts typically work in fields related to the visiting scholar's expertise and may develop joint research projects involving graduate students and other faculty members.

The institute employs a collaborative structure known as the TRIAD model, bringing together a distinguished senior scholar, an early-career faculty member, and graduate students. The model is intended to support scholarly exchange, research development, and mentorship across academic generations.

The institute's appointments are distributed across Texas A&M's colleges, schools, and research institutes, including programs at the university's Galveston campus and School of Law in Fort Worth.

== Funding and administration ==
The institute was established with financial support from the Texas A&M University System, including a five-year commitment of $5.2 million. Its subsequent funding has combined university resources with philanthropic contributions and endowment income. The $20 million commitment made by Jon L. Hagler in 2017 established a major source of permanent financial support for the institute.

The institute's funding supports visiting appointments, scholarly collaboration, and graduate student participation. Private contributions and endowed funds supplement university support. Endowments associated with the institute are managed by the Texas A&M Foundation.

The institute is administered under founding director John L. Junkins. Its organizational structure includes an Administrative Council, a Faculty Advisory Board responsible for evaluating nominees, and an External Advisory Board.

== See also ==
- Texas A&M University
- John L. Junkins
- Lyle Lovett
- Institute for Advanced Study
- Research institute
