= Sphero =

American toy company

Sphero, Inc.
- Formerly: Orbotix
- Type: Private
- Industry: Robotics; Toys
- Founded: 2010; 16 years ago
- Founders: Ian Bernstein; Adam Wilson
- Headquarters: Boulder, Colorado United States
- Website: https://sphero.com

Sphero, Inc. (formerly Orbotix) is an American consumer robotics and toy company based in Boulder, Colorado.

Their first product, the Sphero, is a white spherical robot launched in December 2011 capable of rolling around under the control of a smartphone or tablet. A remastered version, the Sphero 2.0, was launched in August 2013. Both products are now discontinued.

In 2015, Sphero struck a licensing deal with Disney to create a BB-8 robot based on the Star Wars: The Force Awakens film. Following the success of that robot, Sphero also created a model of R2-D2 and Lightning McQueen. The Disney products were discontinued in 2018 after their partnership ended.

Sphero's current product lineup includes several spherical robots like the original Sphero: the Sphero Mini, BOLT, and SPRK+.

On February 19, 2019, Sphero announced a programmable tank-tracked kit called the Sphero RVR (pronounced "rover") on Kickstarter. It is advertised as a "go anywhere, do anything programmable robot" with modular parts and all-terrain capability. It has an increased focus on education, and has been released in October 2019 at $249.

In August 2019, Sphero acquired New York City-based startup, littleBits.

== Products ==
=== Sphero 1.0 and 2.0 ===
The original Sphero was initially prototyped by its inventors, Ian Bernstein and Adam Wilson, with a 3D-printed shell and electronics taken from a smartphone. It was then demonstrated at CES in 2011.

It was released in 2011 and is a white orb that has a diameter of 74 millimetres (2.9 in) and weighs 168 grams (0.370 lb). The processor on board is a 75 MHz ARM Cortex M4. It has two 350 mAh LiPo batteries, two color LEDs, an accelerometer, and a gyroscope. Bluetooth is used for communication and inductive charging for power. A refreshed version, Sphero 2.0, was released in 2013, featuring a twice-as-fast speed and increased LED brightness.

The toys are controlled with a smartphone or tablet running iOS, Android or Windows Phone via Bluetooth. Since they have an accelerometer and a gyroscope, it can also be used as a controller for games on iOS and Android platforms. As it includes an SDK, several apps and games have been developed for the platform.

Users can program the toys with an app called Sphero Macrolab which includes a set of predefined macros, and orbBasic which uses a BASIC-based language.

Both Sphero 1.0 and 2.0 have been discontinued.

Sphero 1.0 is not compatible with either Sphero Play or Sphero EDU apps.

=== Ollie ===
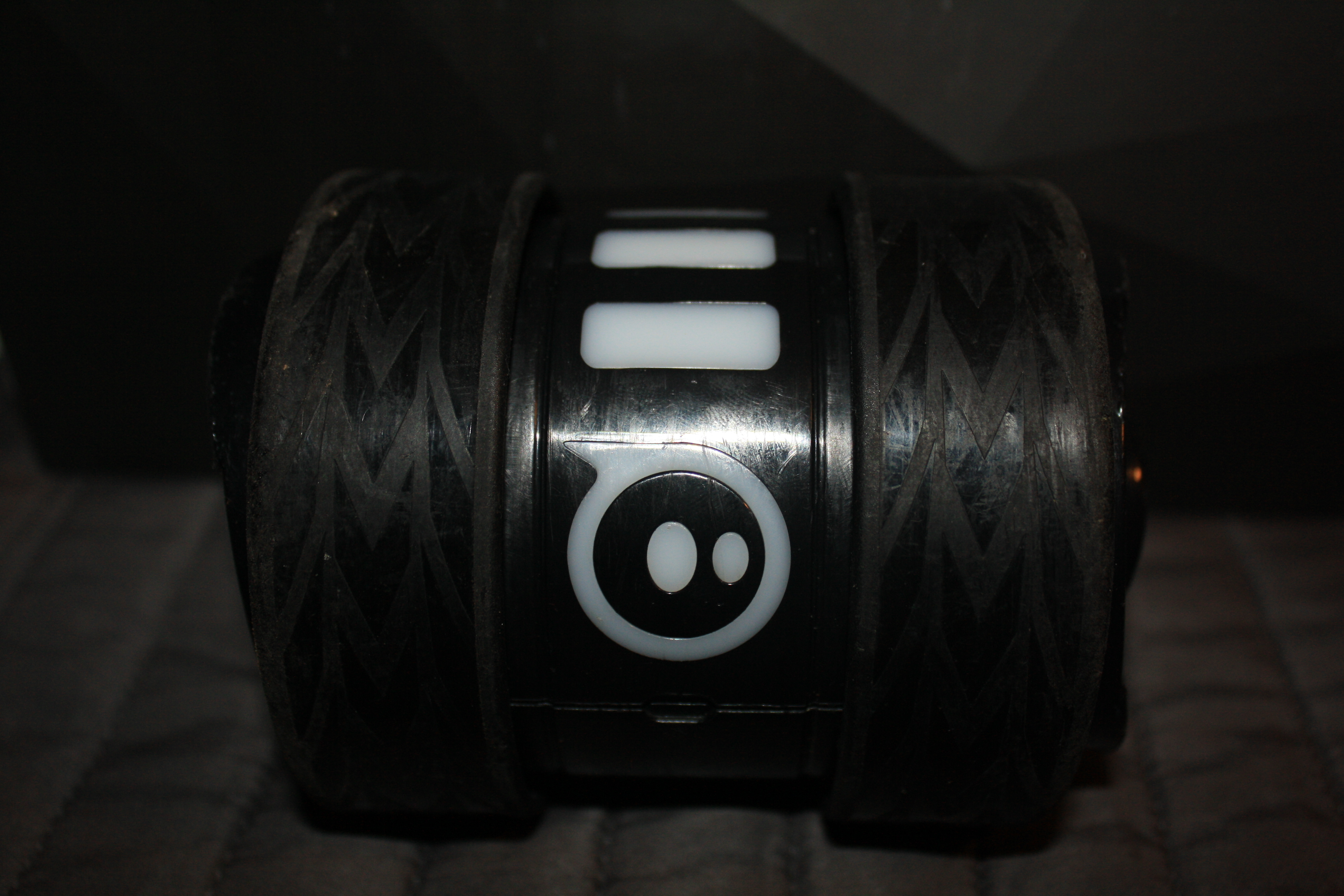
An Ollie Darkside with turbo tires on.

The Sphero Ollie, released in 2014, uses tires instead of being a rolling ball. With its ability to spin, it is more intended for doing tricks. Instead of using inductive charging, the Ollie uses a micro-USB port for charging. It goes at speeds up to 23 km/h (14 mph).

=== BB-8 ===
In July 2014, while participating in Disney's technology accelerator program for startups, Sphero's staff were invited into a private meeting with Disney CEO Bob Iger, who showed them then-unseen photos from the production of the 2015 film Star Wars: The Force Awakens and images of BB-8—a spherical droid character introduced in the film, and were offered a licensing deal to produce an official BB-8 toy based on Sphero's technology. Disney also made a minority investment in Sphero. The BB-8 toy was released on September 4, 2015; it is accompanied by a special Star Wars-themed control app, which also features augmented reality "holographic" messages.

It has been discontinued after the Disney-Sphero partnership ended.

=== R2-D2 ===
Following on from the success of the BB-8 robot, Sphero has released a R2-D2 robot that is powered by Sphero technology. This is accompanied by an app which is available for iOS and Android (operating system) powered devices. The R2-D2 droid, unlike the BB-8 and Sphero droids is not inductively charged, instead, a micro-USB connection is used.

It has been discontinued after the Disney-Sphero partnership ended.

=== Ultimate Lightning McQueen ===
In 2017, Sphero released a robotic car modeled after Lightning McQueen as part of their partnership with Disney.

It has been discontinued after the Disney-Sphero partnership ended.

=== Sphero Bolt ===
Sphero Bolt is a transparent version of the Sphero robot, with a diameter of 73 millimetres (2.9 in) and weighs 200 grams (0.44 lb). It is sealed and has an inductive charger. This model has the most sensors of the various Sphero robots, including motor encoders, gyroscope, accelerometer, 8x8 LED matrix display, compass, infrared, and light sensors.

=== Sphero SPRK+ ===
Sphero SPRK+ is also a transparent version of the Sphero robot, with a diameter of 73 millimetres (2.9 in) and weighs 181 grams (0.399 lb). It is sealed and has an inductive charger. This model is intended for educational use.

=== Sphero Mini ===
Sphero Mini is a smaller version of the Sphero robot, with a diameter of 42 mm (1.7 in) and a weight of 46 grams (1.6 oz; 0.101 lb). It is the first Sphero robot to have interchangeable shells. These shells are very colorful, and come in white, blue, pink, green, and orange, as well as specialty designs such as a golf ball and a (very small) soccer ball. The Mini is the cheapest robot made by Sphero at US$49. The Mini has a new feature called Face Drive which lets the user drive the robot through the app with different head movements. The Mini is charged with a micro USB port, which means that, unlike the Sphero 2.0, it is not waterproof. You can create your own games in the Sphero Edu app with Sphero Mini.

=== Sphero RVR ===
Sphero RVR (pronounced "rover") is a programmable robot kit introduced by Sphero on Kickstarter on February 19, 2019. It is advertised as a "go anywhere, do anything programmable robot."

It can be programmed using the app, either visually or via text JavaScript. The robot is modular, with various sensors and boards able to be attached, including Arduino and Raspberry Pi. It has a swappable battery charged via a USB-C port, and is one of few robots made by Sphero that features a color sensor.

It has an increased focus on education.

It was released in October 2019 at $249.

=== Sphero indi ===
Sphero indi is a programmable robot designed for younger learners. The primary function of the robot is its inclusion of an image sensor to detect different colored cards that it can drive over.

It can be used with the Sphero Edu Jr. app or with no smart device at all.

=== Sphero Bolt+ ===
Sphero Bolt+ is similar to Sphero Bolt, but has a 128x128 pixel LCD screen instead of an 8x8 matrix display.
