= AERCam Sprint =

NASA free-flying robotic camera

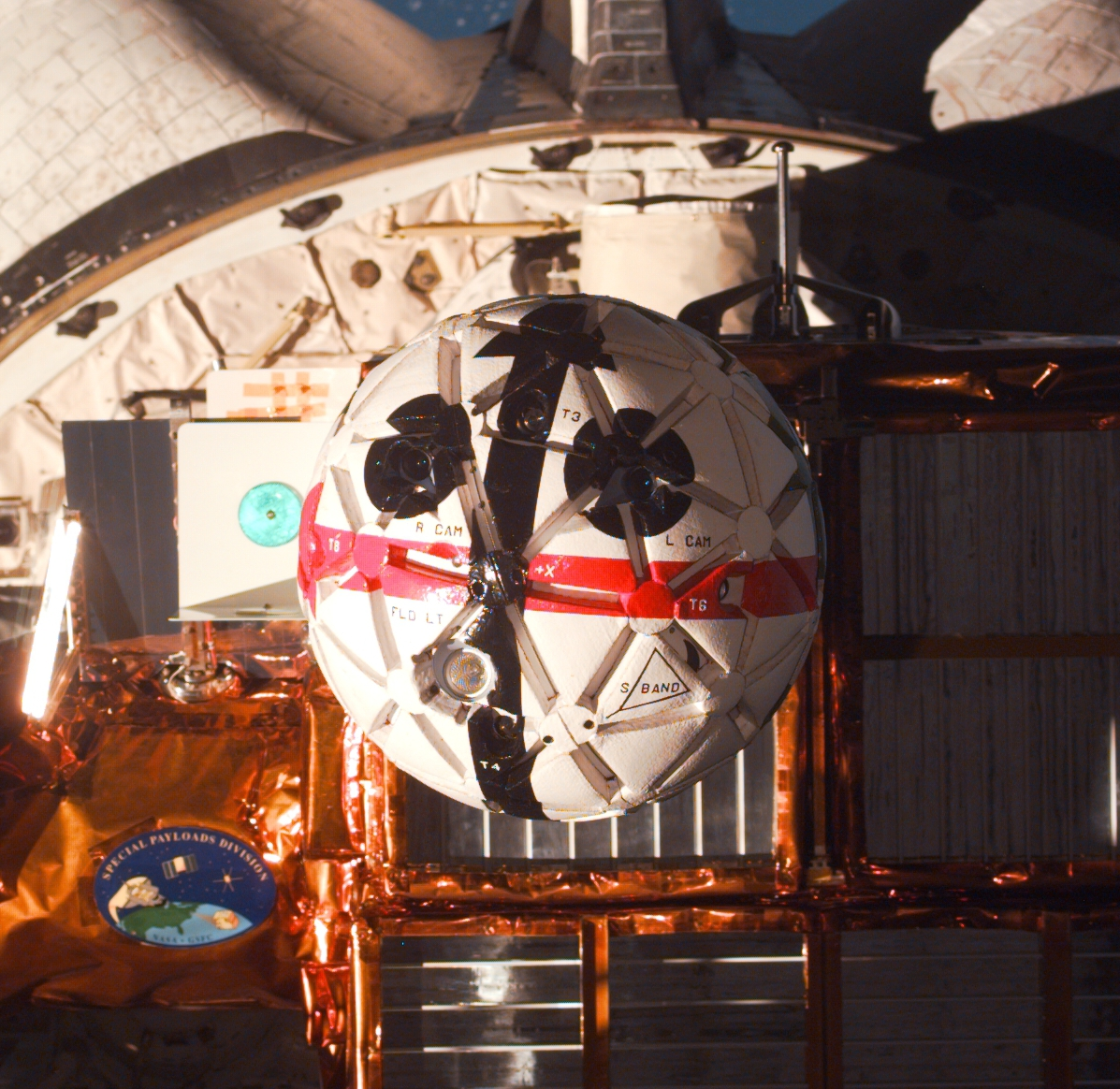
Sprint during STS-87

The Autonomous Extravehicular Activity Robotic Camera Sprint (AERCam Sprint) is a NASA experiment to demonstrate the use of a prototype free-flying television camera. It was tested on STS-87 and could also be used for remote inspections of the exterior of the International Space Station.

The AERCam Sprint free-flyer is a 14-inch-diameter (360 mm), 35-pound (16 kg) sphere that contains two television cameras, an avionics system and 12 small nitrogen gas-powered thrusters. The sphere, which looks like an oversized soccer ball, was released by Mission Specialist Winston E. Scott during the STS-87 spacewalk and flew freely in the forward cargo bay for about 30 minutes. The free-flyer was remotely controlled by Pilot Steven W. Lindsey from the Shuttle's aft flight deck using a hand controller, two laptop computers and a window-mounted antenna. The AERCam is designed to fly very slowly at a rate of less than one-quarter of a foot per second. Remote control of the AERCam is performed through two-way UHF radio communications, with data regarding the status of the free-flyer's systems transmitted back to the operator. Television images are transmitted back to the operator via a one-way S-band communications link. During the experiment operations, live television images were also relayed via Columbia to Mission Control. Two miniature color television cameras are mounted on the free-flyer, one with a 6 millimeter lens and another with a 12 millimeter lens. The exterior of the free-flyer sphere is covered with a 6/10-inch-thick (15 mm) layer of Nomex felt to cushion any inadvertent contact with a spacecraft surface and prevent damage.

== Design ==
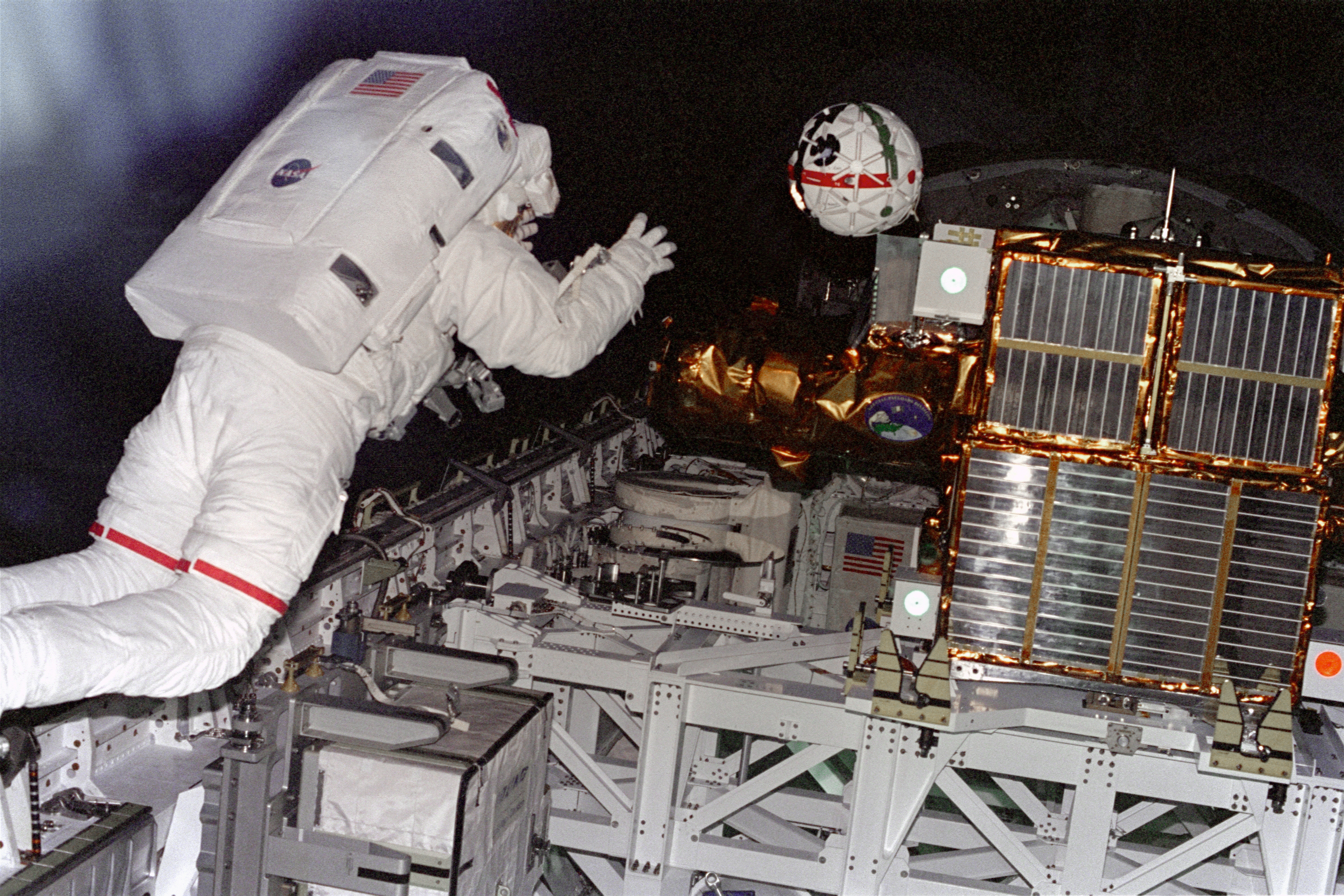
Sprint floating free, prior to retrieval

Most of the free-flyer's systems are derived from the development of the Simplified Aid For EVA Rescue (SAFER) backpack. The AERCam's thrusters, basic avionics, solid-state rate sensors, attitude hold electronics, nitrogen tank and hand controller are identical to those used on the SAFER. The AERCam thrusters, however, produce eight-hundredths of a pound of thrust while the SAFER thrusters produced eight-tenths of a pound of thrust.

The free-flyer is powered by lithium batteries. Its electrical supply and nitrogen supply are designed to last at least seven hours, the maximum length of a normal spacewalk. The AERCam sphere has a small floodlight built in that is identical to floodlights used on the spacesuit helmets. Spaced equally around the sphere also are six small, flashing yellow LEDs that make the free-flyer visible to the operator in darkness.

The front of the sphere is marked by stripes and arrows while the back is marked by dots. These markings assist the operator in determining the orientation of the AERCam. A small fabric strap on the sphere serves as a handhold for the spacewalker while deploying and retrieving the free flyer.

== Follow on ==
NASA designed a follow-on autonomous or teleoperated prototype vehicle called the Mini-AERCam Robotic Space Vehicle. The free-flying robotic inspection vehicle was designed circa 2005 for remote viewing and inspection on human spaceflight missions. "The nanosatellite-class spherical Mini AERCam (Miniature Autonomous Extravehicular Robotic Camera) is just 7.5 inches (190 mm) in diameter and weighs approximately 10 pounds (4.5 kg)." The inspection vehicle moves by means of twelve cold-gas xenon thrusters for attitude and position control, distributed in four thruster pods on the vehicle. The Mini-AERCam never flew on a space mission.

== See also ==
- SPHERES
- Seeker (spacecraft)
