= Spherical robot =

Type of mobile robot

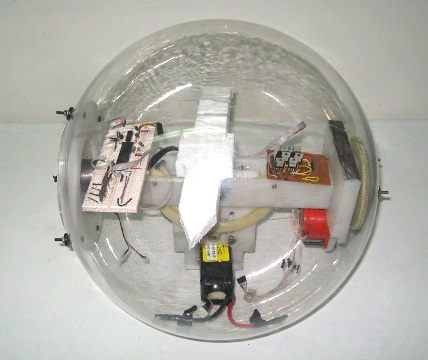
A pendulum-driven spherical mobile robot. (The white arrow is used to determine the position and orientation of the robot via a vision-based algorithm.)

A spherical robot, also known as spherical mobile robot, or ball-shaped robot is a mobile robot with spherical external shape. A spherical robot is typically made of a spherical shell serving as the body of the robot and an internal driving unit (IDU) that enables the robot to move. Spherical mobile robots typically move by rolling over surfaces. The rolling motion is commonly performed by changing the robot's center of mass (i.e., pendulum-driven system), but there exist some other driving mechanisms. In a wider sense, however, the term "spherical robot" may also be referred to a stationary robot with two rotary joints and one prismatic joint which forms a spherical coordinate system (e.g., Stanford arm).

The spherical shell is usually made of solid transparent material but it can also be made of opaque or flexible material for special applications or because of special drive mechanisms. The spherical shell can fully seal the robot from the outside environment. There exist reconfigurable spherical robots that can transform the spherical shell into other structures and perform other tasks aside from rolling.

Spherical robots can operate as autonomous robots, or as remotely controlled (teleoperated) robots. In almost all the spherical robots, communication between the internal driving unit and the external control unit (data logging or navigation system) is wireless because of the mobility and closed nature of the spherical shell. The power source of these robots is mostly a battery located inside the robot but there exist some spherical robots that utilize solar cells. Spherical mobile robots can be categorized either by their application or by their drive mechanism.

== Applications ==
Spherical mobile robots have applications in surveillance, environmental monitoring, patrol, underwater and planetary exploration, rehabilitation, child-development, and entertainment. Spherical robots can be used as amphibious robots viable on land as well as on (or under) water.

== Locomotion ==
The most common drive mechanisms of the spherical robots operate by changing the robot's center of mass. Other driving mechanisms make use of: (1) conservation of angular velocity by flywheels, (2) environment's wind, (3) distorting the spherical shell, and (4) gyroscopic effect.

== Current research ==
The research on spherical robots involves studies on design and prototyping, dynamical modelling and simulation, control, motion planning, and navigation. From a theoretical point of view, the rolling motion of a spherical robot on a surface represents a nonholonomic system which has been particularly studied in the scope of control and motion planning.

== Commercial spherical robots ==
Commercial spherical robots are available for sale to the public. Some current commercial products are GroundBot, Roball, and QueBall, as well as Sphero's BB-8, based on the droid character of the same name introduced in the 2015 film Star Wars: The Force Awakens. Samsung Ballie is a Spherical Rolling tennis Ball look alike personal robot which was introduced in Samsung CES2020. Sajid Sadi VP of the research team at Samsung is quoted saying that "Ballie’s ability to move around enables it to respond to a person wherever they are. Parents could ask Ballie to check up on kids to make sure they’ve completed their homework, for instance, or monitor the types of television shows and movies they’re watching."

== See also ==
- Mobile robot
- SPHERES
