= Kerri Cahoy =

Electrical and aerospace engineer

- Education: Cornell University (BS); Stanford University (MS); Stanford University (PhD)
- Spouse: John Cahoy
- Scientific career
- Fields: Electrical Engineering; Aerospace Engineering
- Workplaces: MIT, SpaceRake
- Doctoral advisor: G. Leonard Tyler

Professor Kerri L. Cahoy is an electrical and aerospace engineer and a professor of Aeronautics and Astronautics at MIT. She is also the co-founder of laser communications firm SpaceRake. Cahoy is the leader of the Space Telecommunications, Astronomy and Radiation Laboratory (STAR) at MIT, and she is most well known for her research in studying planetary atmospheres and exoplanet atmospheres along with her technology demonstration work on nanosatellites.

== Early life and family ==
Cahoy's parents are Joseph Jay and Barbara Kusza of Wallingford, CT. She attended Choate Rosemary Hall in Wallingford for high school and graduated in 1996. Her father was an electrician, which she cites is one of the things that inspired her to study electrical engineering. She stated in an interview that she chose to go into electrical engineering because she loved the way it challenged her and enjoyed reading and writing. As she now works in the field of aeronautics and astronautics, she has stated how she enjoys studying the applications of electrical engineering in helping to further explore the Earth and beyond.

== Education and career ==
Cahoy attended Cornell University for her Bachelor of Science in electrical engineering and graduated in 2000. She then attended Stanford University for her Master of Science (2002) and Ph.D. (2008) both in electrical engineering. At Stanford, she served as a graduate research assistant for several courses in the Department of Electrical Engineering. Additionally, it was there that Cahoy continued combining her passions for electrical engineering and aerospace as she studied how we could learn more about weather on planets beyond Earth using instrumentation like satellite radio signals. Her dissertation was entitled Characterization of thermal tides at ionospheric altitudes on Mars with Mars Global Surveyor Radio Occultation measurements of electron density and her principal adviser was emeritus Professor G. Leonard Tyler. From 2006 to 2008, she served as a Senior Communication Sciences Specialist and Senior Engineering Specialist at Space Systems Loral. After finishing her Ph.D., she served as a NASA Postdoctoral Program Fellow in Moffet Field, California where she focused on studying exoplanets through direct imaging of exoplanets and modeling exoplanet atmospheres.

Cahoy started her career at MIT in June 2010 on the research staff in Earth and Planetary Sciences affiliated with the NASA Goddard Space Flight Center. In July 2011, she became an assistant professor of Aeronautics and Astronautics. At that time, she also became the director of the MIT Space Telecommunications, Astronomy and Radiation Laboratory (STAR). In July 2016, she became an associate professor of Aeronautics and Astronautics, and in July 2023, she became a full Professor of Aeronautics and Astronautics. In November 2023, she was titled the Associate Department Head. She is also a faculty member in the Space Systems Laboratory at MIT and a co-director of the Small Satellite Collaborative at MIT.

== Research and work ==
Research and STAR Laboratory

Cahoy's research has investigated heavily in technology demonstrations with nanosatellites, or CubeSat platforms. She directs the STAR lab at MIT which is focused on four key areas: weather sensing, connectivity, exoplanet detection and characterization, and nanosatellite technology. Her work aims to get groups, or "constellations" of the small satellites to work together to gather data to inform research on the applications mentioned.

One of these CubeSat platforms called DeMi was launched from Wallops Island, Virginia in February 2020. On this CubeSat is a deformable mirror that can help in detecting exoplanets and picturing distant stars. Cahoy and her students will continue to study the data from DeMi in the coming years.

One element of her research is to develop and enhance laser communication terminals and ground stations so that the groups of satellites can have crosslink communications. This enables the satellites to have joint observations. Cahoy currently serves as the Principal Investigator for multiple NASA missions related to laser communication including "Miniature Optical Steered Antenna for Intersatellite Communication" (MOSAIC) and "CubeSat Laser Infrared CrosslinK" (CLICK).

Cahoy's research is also influential in the field of exoplanet detection and characterization especially in the realm of imaging and detecting exoplanets. Her lab has contributed to missions including NASA's Transiting Exoplanet Survey Satellite (TESS) and Laser Guide Star for Large Aperture Segmented Space Telescopes (LGS).

Her research also contributes to the field of weather sensing in which she studies how CubeSats (or small satellites) with instrumentation for weather sensing "can passively make precise measurements of atmospheric temperature at different altitudes". Her team has flown 3 CubeSats so far, and the success has proven that these smaller scale satellites can oftentimes provide comparable data to that of larger instruments or spacecraft. In October 2019, Cahoy gave a TED Talk called "How Tiny Satellites Can Help Us Weather Through Hurricanes". She discussed how large satellites that collect data for weather forecasting can leave large gaps of data in areas that happen to be most affected by hurricanes. To fix this problem, there needs to be more satellites which are not only costly but can take a while to build. Not only can the smaller CubeSats help fill in the gap of this data, but also they are less costly.

Notable Publication

Cahoy's most cited work is Thermal emission and reflected light spectra of super Earths with flat transmission spectra published in 2015 in The Astrophysics Journal. The work studies "Super Earths" and models to predict "their transmission, thermal emission and reflected light spectra." The work currently has over 230 citations.

SpaceRake

Cahoy is also a co-founder of SpaceRake, which specializes in laser communication technologies. The company is currently working on three main endeavors: (1) Cubesat-Compatible Terminal, Human-Portable Lasercom Ground Terminal, and Multi-Access Router Architecture. In November 2023, SpaceRake was awarded their first government contract. It awarded them $1.8 million for the purposes of developing "miniature laser communications terminals."

== Awards and honors ==
- 2020: Committed to Caring, MIT
- 2018: Associate Fellow, American Institute of Aeronautics and Astronautics (AIAA)
- 2013: Outstanding UROP Mentor, MIT
- 2008: Co-Op Mentor of the Year, Cornell University

== Memberships ==
- American Astronomical Society
- American Institute of Aeronautics and Astronautics (AIAA)
- Institute of Electrical and Electronics Engineers (IEEE)
- MIT AeroAstro Diversity, Equity, and Inclusion Committee Chairperson
- National Society for Optics and Photonics
