= NASA Chief Technologist =

Senior technology position at NASA

- Status: Abolished
- Reports to: NASA Administrator
- Appointer: NASA Administrator
- Formation: 2010
- First holder: Bobby Braun
- Final holder: A.C. Charania
- Abolished: March 10, 2025

The chief technologist was the most senior technology position at the National Aeronautics and Space Administration (NASA). The chief technologist had served as the principal advisor to the NASA Administrator in technology policy and programs, and as interface to the national and international engineering community. The position had "communicate how NASA technologies benefit space missions and the day-to-day lives of Americans." This position was eliminated in March 2025 as part of the Trump's administration reduction in force as a "cost-cutting measure".

== History ==
The chief technologist position was created to advise the NASA Administrator on budget, strategic objectives, and current content of NASA's technology programs. The chief technologist works closely with appropriate representatives of the NASA Strategic Enterprises and the Field Centers, as well as advisory committees and the external community. The chief technologist represents the agency's technology objectives and accomplishments to other federal agencies, industry, academia, other government organizations, the international community, and the general public. "The Chief Technologist leads NASA technology transfer and technology commercialization efforts, facilitating internal creativity and innovation." He also "coordinates, tracks and integrates technology investments across the agency and works to infuse innovative discoveries into future missions."

The position was created in 2010 by NASA Administrator Charlie Bolden. The first three chief technologists were aerospace engineering professors whose universities (specified below) entered into an intergovernmental personnel agreement with NASA. Douglas Terrier, was the NASA Johnson Space Center chief technologist before becoming the agency chief technologist.

On November 1, 2021 the Office of the Chief Technologist and the Office of Strategic Engagements and Assessments were merged into the new Office of Technology, Policy, and Strategy (OTPS). Bhavya Lal was appointed to serve as OTPS's new associate administrator. The role of the NASA chief technologist was changed to one of a staff position in the newly created OTPS. Douglas Terrier was reassigned to NASA's Johnson Space Center (JSC) in Houston to serve in a newly created position as the associate director for vision and strategy. Lal served as acting chief technologist.

On January 3, 2023 A.C.Charania started his role as the agency chief technologist. Before joining NASA, Charania served as vice president of product strategy at Reliable Robotics. He previously worked in strategy and business development for the Virgin Galactic (now Virgin Orbit) LauncherOne small satellite launch vehicle program. He also served in multiple management and technology roles at SpaceWorks Enterprises, including helping to incubate two startups, Generation Orbit and Terminal Velocity Aerospace.

== List of chief technologists ==
No.	Image	Chief Technologist	Term start	Term end	Notes
1		Bobby Braun	February 3, 2010	September 30, 2011	
Acting		Joseph Parrish	October 1, 2011	December 31, 2011	
2		Mason Peck	January 1, 2012	2013	
3		Dave Miller	March 17, 2014	2016	
Acting		Dennis J. Andrucyk	2016	January 17, 2017	
acting		Douglas Terrier	2017	2018	
4		Douglas Terrier	2018	October 31, 2021	
acting		Bhavya Lal	November 1, 2021	January 3, 2023	
5		A.C. Charania	January 3, 2023	March 10, 2025	
Position was eliminated in March 2025.
