= Astrobee (robot) =

Free-flying robotic system

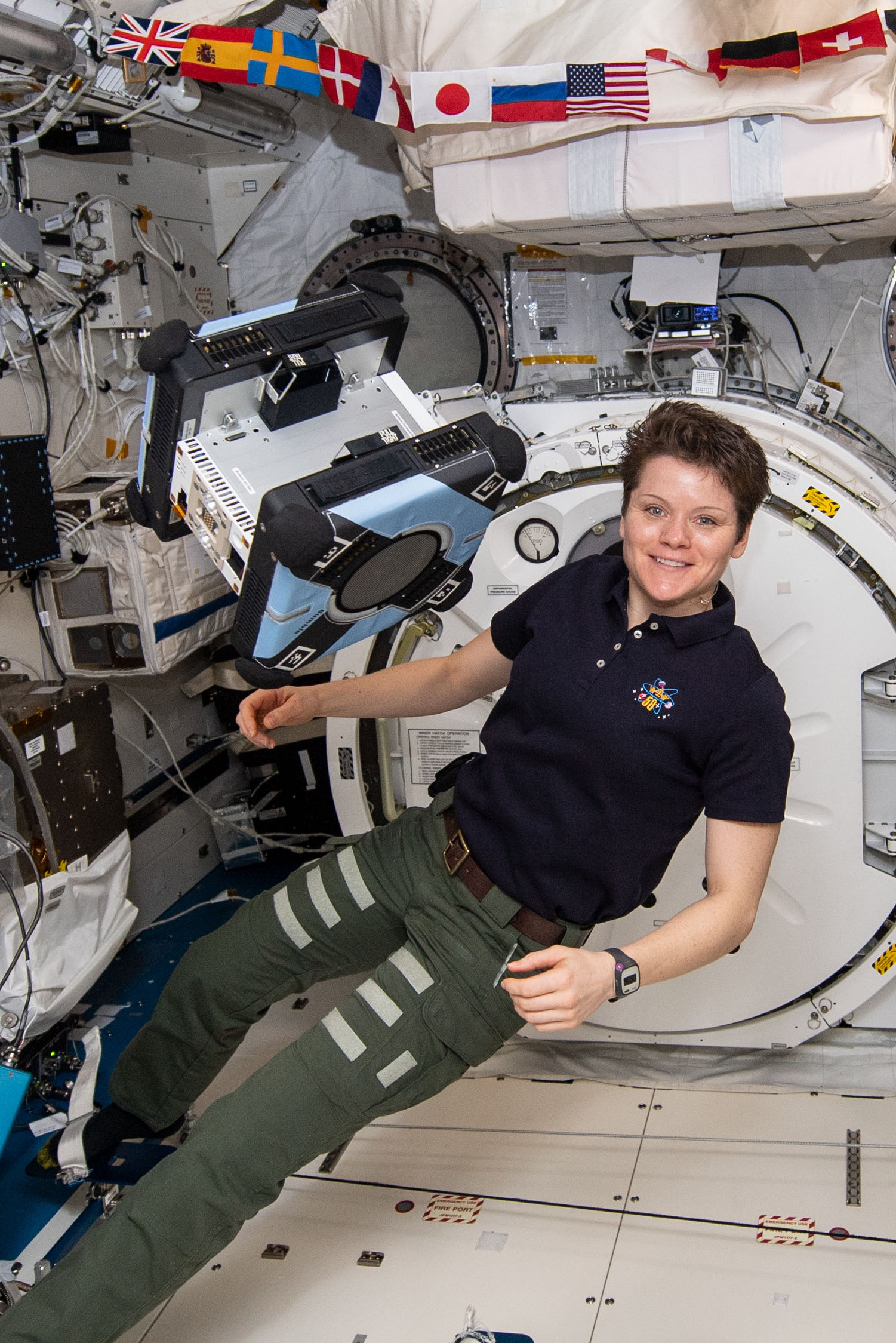
NASA astronaut Anne McClain with Astrobee robot "Bumble" in the Kibo module of the International Space Station.

Astrobee is a robotic system developed by the US space agency NASA to assist astronauts aboard the International Space Station (ISS). Astrobee consists of three 12.5-inch cube-shaped robots named Honey, Queen, and Bumble, along with software and a docking station for recharging. Astrobee was created to perform some routine tasks on the ISS, allowing astronauts to focus on tasks which require human activities.

== Overview ==
Astrobee can operate either autonomously or under remote control by astronauts, flight controllers, or ground researchers. The robots are equipped with cameras and sensors to navigate the microgravity environment and perform tasks such as inventory management, experiment documentation, and cargo movement. The robots utilize an electric fan to push air through 12 nozzles, enabling free flight within the space station.

Astrobee was designed to improve upon the design of the Synchronized Position Hold, Engage, Reorient, Experimental Satellites (SPHERES) which were already aboard the ISS.

Each robot is a equipped with a perching arm that allows it to grasp handrails for energy conservation, to manipulate items, and assist astronauts.

== History ==
The docking station launched on November 17, 2018, aboard Northrop Grumman's Cygnus NG-10 mission and was installed on February 15, 2019, in the Japanese Experiment Module.

Free-flying robots Bumble and Honey launched on April 17, 2019, via the NG-11 mission. The third robot, Queen, and three perching arms were launched on July 25, 2019, aboard SpaceX's SpX-18 mission. Honey ultimately ended up returning to Earth aboard SpX-23 for maintenance and returned to the space station aboard NG-19.

== Additional information ==
Astrobee, like SPHERES before it, is a part of NASA's initiative to advance guest research on the ISS. Using the robots, researchers on Earth are able to access most of the space station without the need for astronaut interaction. In addition to research opportunities, Astrobee has been used for educational purposes, with teams of students using them to complete challenges similar to tasks robots may be used for in the future.

The propulsion system of each Astrobee robot relies on a pair of impellers that pressurize air inside the robot. This pressurized air can then be vented through 12 different nozzles, allowing the robot to rotate or translate in any direction without the need for external moving parts or pressurized gas canisters. Astrobee is equipped with multiple cameras, a touch screen, a laser pointer, lights, and a 'Terminate Button' that, when pressed, quickly shuts down the propulsion and payload systems while keeping the main processors operational for communication with ground control.

The onboard sensing and computing capabilities enable Astrobee to operate autonomously, and its flight software, based on ROS, is upgradable in-orbit. The robot's modular design additionally allows for expanded capabilities in the future.

== Future contributions ==
Astrobee's modular design allows guest scientists to conduct diverse experiments to help develop technology for future space missions. The system is expected to play a crucial role in NASA's lunar exploration plans and other deep space missions, potentially serving as caretakers for spacecraft like the Lunar Gateway during crew absences.

== Use In Education ==
=== Zero Robotics ===
Zero Robotics is an annual international programming competition conducted by the Massachusetts Institute of Technology (MIT), in partnership with NASA and other organizations. Student teams program robotic platforms to solve a specific challenge involving navigation and control in microgravity environments aboard the International Space Station (ISS).

Initially, the competition used the SPHERES (Synchronized Position Hold Engage and Reorient Experimental Satellites) robotic platforms—free-flying robots used inside the ISS for research on satellite formation flying and control algorithms. Although referred to as "satellites," SPHERES were not orbiting the Earth independently but operated exclusively within the microgravity environment of the ISS.

In recent years, the competition transitioned to using Astrobee robots, a newer generation of free-flying robotic assistants developed by NASA for autonomous operation on the ISS. (This change began around 2022, following the retirement of SPHERES in 2019). The Astrobee system provides enhanced capabilities including vision-based navigation and more advanced computing power.

The competition is held in two tiers: the middle school tournament and the high school tournament. Initial rounds take place in simulation, and the finalists' programs are uploaded to the robotic platforms aboard the ISS and executed in real time. The final event is broadcast live to audiences in the United States, Europe, and Australia.
