= Space Systems Laboratory (MIT) =

Space Systems Laboratory at the Massachusetts Institute of Technology

- MIT_SSL_logo
- Nickname: MIT SSL
- Established: 1995
- Research type: Engineering
- Field of research: Aeronautics & Astronautics
- Directors: Rebecca Masterson; Dr. Richard Linares
- Faculty: 7
- Staff: 3
- Location: Cambridge, MA, USA
- Campus: Massachusetts Institute of Technology
- Website: http://ssl.scripts.mit.edu/www/

The Space Systems Laboratory (SSL) is in the Department of Aeronautics and Astronautics at the Massachusetts Institute of Technology in Cambridge, MA. Its mission is to develop the technology and systems analysis associated with small spacecraft, precision optical systems, and International Space Station technology research and development.

== History ==
A previous Space Systems Laboratory (Maryland) was founded at MIT in 1976, by faculty members Renee Miller and J.W. Mar. In 1990, lab director Dr. Dave Akin moved the lab to the University of Maryland.

The current Space Systems Laboratory was founded in 1995 at MIT. It began as a part of the Space Engineering Research Center (SERC).

The laboratory has a practice of Conceive-Design-Implement-Operate (CDIO), working to provide students hands-on learning as a part of their coursework. One of the laboratory's flagship research testbeds, SPHERES, began in 1999 as an undergraduate senior design project.

== People ==
The current directors of the SSL are Rebecca Masterson and Prof. Richard Linares. The principal research scientist is Alvar Saenz-Otero. Former director Prof. Dave Miller is now faculty for the laboratory. Long time staff include Marilyn Good and Paul Bauer.

Faculty members include:

- Dr. Daniel Hastings
- Dr. Jeffrey Hoffman, former NASA Astronaut
- Dr. Olivier de Weck
- Dr. Kerri Cahoy
- Dr. Sara Seager, a MacArthur Fellow
- Dr. Richard Binzel

== Projects ==
- OSIRIS-REx's REXIS
- ROAM: Relative Operations for Autonomous Maneuvers
- ReCon
- iSAT
- Advanced Telescope Concepts

=== ISS Research ===
- SPHERES
  - Zero Robotics, a competition for middle and high school students on the International Space Station
  - VERTIGO (Visual Estimation and Relative Tracking for Inspection of Generic Objects)
  - RINGS (Resonant Inductive Near-field Generation System)
- MACE II

=== CubeSats ===
- MicroMAS (Micro-sized Microwave Atmospheric Satellite)
- MicroMAS-2
- ExoplanetSat
- inflated antenna

=== Space Shuttle Research ===
- Middeck 0-Gravity Dynamics Experiment (MODE), STS-48
- Middeck Active Control Experiment (MACE), STS-67
- Dynamic Load Sensor (DLS), STS-62

== Partners ==
- MIT Lincoln Laboratory
- Aerospace
- NASA
- NASA's Jet Propulsion Laboratory
- DARPA
- University of Maryland
  - Space Systems Laboratory (Maryland)
- Aurora Flight Sciences
- Draper Laboratory

=== Associated NASA Programs ===
- Small Satellite Technology Initiative (SSTI)
- New Millennium Program
- International Space Station Technology Testbed Program

== Alumni ==
While the students go off to a wide variety of careers, many SSL graduates have gone to NASA's Jet Propulsion Laboratory. In particular, several have been on the Entry, Descent, and Landing (EDL) teams of Mars missions. Allen Chen and Dr. Swati Mohan announced the touchdown of the Mars Science Laboratory and Mars 2020 rovers, respectively.

The laboratory also has strong ties to the United States Air Force, with several students coming from the USAF Academy. Dr. Miller worked with the Academy to create fully funded graduate scholarships to MIT for graduates of its FalconSAT program.

== In the news ==
A 2014 paper from PhD candidate Sydney Do and several additional SSL graduate students received world-wide attention for its assessment that astronauts wouldn't be able to survive in the Mars One project's design more than a few couple of the months. The analysis was performed based on publicly available information of the design.
