= John Junkins =

American aerospace engineer and academic

John L. Junkins
- Born: May 23, 1943 (age 83); Oakman, Georgia, United States
- Alma mater: Auburn University (B.A.E.); University of California, Los Angeles (M.S., Ph.D.)
- Known for: Research in spacecraft dynamics and control; founding director of the Hagler Institute for Advanced Study
- Awards: National Academy of Engineering (1996); National Academy of Inventors Fellow (2016); Robert H. Goddard Astronautics Award (2019); Kay Bailey Hutchison Distinguished Service Award (2022)
- Scientific career
- Fields: Aerospace engineering, astrodynamics, spacecraft guidance, navigation and control
- Workplaces: University of Virginia; Virginia Tech; Texas A&M University
- Doctoral advisor: Samuel Herrick

John L. Junkins (born May 23, 1943) is an American aerospace engineer, academic, and university administrator. He is a Distinguished Professor of Aerospace Engineering, Regents Professor, and holder of the Royce E. Wisenbaker '39 Chair at Texas A&M University. His research has focused on spacecraft dynamics, guidance, navigation, control, astrodynamics, and related aerospace technologies.

Junkins was elected to the National Academy of Engineering in 1996 for contributions to flight mechanics and flexible vehicle control. He is a member of the International Academy of Astronautics, a Fellow of the National Academy of Inventors, and an Honorary Fellow of the American Institute of Aeronautics and Astronautics (AIAA).

He founded the Hagler Institute for Advanced Study at Texas A&M University and has served as its founding director since the institute began operations in 2011. He served as interim president of Texas A&M University from January 1 through May 31, 2021.

== Early life and education ==
John Junkins was born on May 23, 1943, in Oakman, Georgia, to George Manley Junkins (1917–1986), from Carter's Quarter, Georgia, and Alice Lenell Junkins (née Searcy; 1922–2008), from Gordon County, Georgia. His father was a World War II veteran who worked as a machinist, mechanic, and welder, while his mother worked in the textile industry.

Junkins grew up in a family of five siblings. One of his sisters, Faye Gibbons, became an author and an inaugural inductee of the Alabama Writers Hall of Fame. His father left school after the sixth grade and his mother after the fourth grade, but both valued education and encouraged their children to pursue it.

Junkins spent his childhood on his family's five-acre farm near Dalton, Georgia. He attended North Whitfield High School, where he participated in football and track and field.

He developed an interest in aerospace engineering following the launch of Sputnik 1 in 1957, when he was a high school freshman. During the spring of his senior year, his track coach, Crossland Clegg, encouraged him to recognize his academic potential. Clegg believed that, despite Junkins's athletic ability, he had even greater potential in academic pursuits.

Junkins has also identified President John F. Kennedy's commitment to landing Americans on the Moon as an influence on his decision to study aerospace engineering.

After high school, Junkins hoped to attend the Georgia Institute of Technology, but his rural high school had not offered all the courses needed for admission. He initially enrolled at Berry College in Rome, Georgia, where he competed on the track team and won the Georgia Intercollegiate Athletic Conference championship in the pole vault.

In spring 1962, Junkins was accepted as a transfer student to Georgia Tech. However, his Berry College roommate, Spiros Pallas, who was also a member of the track team, persuaded him to visit Auburn University. Junkins was impressed by Auburn and decided to investigate transferring there instead.

During a visit in August 1962, Junkins found the home telephone number of Auburn's registrar in a telephone directory and called him on a Sunday afternoon. After hearing about Junkins's interest in attending Auburn, the registrar invited him to his home and encouraged him to apply. Junkins was accepted and enrolled in Auburn's aerospace engineering program in September 1962.

He earned his bachelor's degree in aerospace engineering from Auburn University in 1965. He continued his education at the University of California, Los Angeles, receiving a master's degree in aerospace engineering in 1967 and a Ph.D. in 1969.

His doctoral advisor was Samuel Herrick. His dissertation, On the Determination and Optimization of Powered Space Vehicle Trajectories Using Parametric Differential Correction Processes, addressed the determination and optimization of spacecraft trajectories.

== Academic and professional career ==
=== Early aerospace work ===
Junkins began his aerospace career at age 19 as a cooperative education student while attending Auburn University. He worked in Huntsville, Alabama, in the organization led by Wernher von Braun during the Apollo program. He later supported work associated with the final three Apollo lunar missions: Apollo 15, Apollo 16, and Apollo 17.

During his graduate studies at UCLA, Junkins worked for McDonnell Douglas, supporting satellite launches using the Delta rocket family.

Following completion of his doctorate, Junkins joined the faculty of the University of Virginia in 1970 as an assistant professor. In 1978, he joined Virginia Polytechnic Institute and State University (Virginia Tech) as a professor.

He moved to Texas A&M University in 1985, becoming an endowed chair holder in the College of Engineering. He subsequently received appointments as Distinguished Professor of Aerospace Engineering and Regents Professor and became holder of the Royce E. Wisenbaker Chair.

=== Research ===
Junkins's research has included spacecraft guidance, navigation and control; orbital mechanics; spacecraft attitude dynamics; trajectory optimization; optimal estimation; flexible aerospace structures; and autonomous navigation systems.

His work has combined mathematical analysis, numerical methods, experiments, and engineering applications. Research topics have included the identification of star patterns for spacecraft navigation, spacecraft attitude determination, satellite orbit estimation, spacecraft maneuver design, and the control of flexible structures.

His research has been supported by government agencies and industry, including the National Aeronautics and Space Administration and the United States Department of Defense. He has authored and co-authored books, journal articles, conference papers, and technical reports concerning aerospace dynamics and control.

=== Teaching and doctoral supervision ===
Junkins has supervised more than sixty doctoral students. His former students have pursued careers in universities, government laboratories, and the aerospace industry. Some have subsequently supervised doctoral students of their own, creating multiple generations of academic descendants.

=== Career chronology ===
- 1970–1977: University of Virginia
- 1978–1985: Virginia Polytechnic Institute and State University
- 1985–present: Texas A&M University

== Hagler Institute for Advanced Study ==
Junkins founded the Hagler Institute for Advanced Study at Texas A&M University to bring distinguished scholars from around the world to the university for extended research collaborations with faculty members and graduate students.

The Texas A&M University System Board of Regents established the institute in December 2010. It began operations in 2011 under the name Texas A&M University Institute for Advanced Study. Junkins became its founding director.

In 2017, the institute was renamed the Hagler Institute for Advanced Study following a $20 million endowment commitment from Texas A&M alumnus and philanthropist Jon L. Hagler.

Junkins worked with former aerospace executive Norman R. Augustine to establish an External Advisory Board to provide guidance on the institute's development.

The institute appoints internationally recognized visiting scholars as Hagler Fellows and also selects Distinguished Lecturers. These appointments are intended to support collaborative research, graduate education, and faculty development across academic disciplines.

In October 2026, the institute announced its fifteenth class, consisting of ten Hagler Fellows and one Distinguished Lecturer. Its first fifteen classes, spanning 2012–2013 through 2026–2027, had selected 172 scholars: 156 Hagler Fellows and 16 Distinguished Lecturers. Seventeen of the selected scholars had subsequently joined the permanent Texas A&M faculty.

=== Chancellor's National Academy STEM Ph.D. Fellowship Program ===
Junkins was involved in developing the Chancellor's National Academy STEM Ph.D. Fellowship Program at Texas A&M University, established in 2024. The program recruits doctoral students in science, technology, engineering, and mathematics and provides mentoring involving Texas A&M faculty members and members of the national academies.

The program's first cohort consisted of fifteen doctoral students entering in fall 2025. A second cohort of fifteen students was selected for the 2026–2027 academic year. The program combines financial support with mentoring and research opportunities.

== Interim president of Texas A&M University ==
On November 24, 2020, Texas A&M University System Chancellor John Sharp recommended Junkins to serve as interim president of Texas A&M University following the departure of Michael K. Young. Junkins assumed the position on January 1, 2021.

After his selection, Junkins described his responsibilities in a statement released by Texas A&M University:

"My job will be to help navigate Texas A&M safely along our presently planned course and work with existing senior leadership and the faculty to solve problems as they arise until our new president takes the helm, hopefully by June."

Junkins served as interim president during the COVID-19 pandemic, campus and national discussions concerning racial justice, and the severe February 2021 winter storm in Texas.

His interim presidency ended on May 31, 2021, when M. Katherine Banks succeeded him as president. Junkins returned to his academic and research activities and continued serving as founding director of the Hagler Institute for Advanced Study.

== Awards and honors ==
Junkins has received awards and professional recognition from aerospace engineering, navigation, and scientific organizations. He was elected to the National Academy of Engineering in 1996 for contributions to flight mechanics and flexible vehicle control.

His awards and honors include:

- 1983 – Mechanics and Control of Flight Award, American Institute of Aeronautics and Astronautics
- 1987 – Dirk Brouwer Award, American Astronautical Society
- 1988 – J. Leland Atwood Award, American Society for Engineering Education and American Institute of Aeronautics and Astronautics
- 1990 – G. Edward Pendray Aerospace Literature Award, American Institute of Aeronautics and Astronautics
- 1996 – Election to the National Academy of Engineering
- 1997 – Theodore von Kármán Lectureship in Astronautics Award, American Institute of Aeronautics and Astronautics
- 1999 – Frank J. Malina Astronautics Medal, International Astronautical Federation
- 2003 – Tycho Brahe Award, Institute of Navigation
- 2006 – Aerospace Guidance, Navigation and Control Award, American Institute of Aeronautics and Astronautics
- 2011 – Honorary Fellow, American Institute of Aeronautics and Astronautics
- 2011 – Lifetime Achievement Award, International Conference on Computational and Experimental Engineering and Sciences
- 2013 – Martin Summerfield Best Book Award, American Institute of Aeronautics and Astronautics, jointly with Hanspeter Schaub
- 2016 – Fellow, National Academy of Inventors
- 2016 – Inaugural Partner in Philanthropy Faculty Award, Texas A&M Foundation
- 2019 – Robert H. Goddard Astronautics Award, American Institute of Aeronautics and Astronautics
- 2022 – Kay Bailey Hutchison Distinguished Service Award, Texas Academy of Medicine, Engineering, Science and Technology

The Kay Bailey Hutchison Distinguished Service Award was announced in 2021 and presented at TAMEST's 2022 annual conference. TAMEST officially lists Junkins as its 2022 recipient.

=== Asteroid named in his honor ===
In November 2024, the International Astronomical Union's Working Group for Small Body Nomenclature approved the name 5964 Johnjunkins for a main-belt asteroid in recognition of Junkins's contributions to aerospace engineering. Texas A&M University reported the naming in February 2025.

== Publications ==
=== Books ===
- Junkins, John L. (1978). An Introduction to Optimal Estimation of Dynamical Systems. Sijthoff-Noordhoff.
- Junkins, John L.; Turner, James D. (1986). Optimal Spacecraft Rotational Maneuvers. Elsevier.
- Junkins, John L.; Kim, Youdan (1993). Introduction to Dynamics and Control of Flexible Structures. American Institute of Aeronautics and Astronautics.
- Crassidis, John L.; Junkins, John L. (2004). Optimal Estimation of Dynamic Systems. CRC Press.
- Schaub, Hanspeter; Junkins, John L. (2003). Analytical Mechanics of Space Systems. American Institute of Aeronautics and Astronautics.
- Schaub, Hanspeter; Junkins, John L. (2009). Analytical Mechanics of Space Systems, second edition. American Institute of Aeronautics and Astronautics.
- Singla, Puneet; Junkins, John L. (2009). Multi-Resolution Methods for Modeling and Control of Dynamical Systems. CRC Press.
- Crassidis, John L.; Junkins, John L. (2011). Optimal Estimation of Dynamic Systems, second edition. CRC Press.
- Junkins, John L. (2012). Engineering Your Academic Career. Lulu Press.
- Schaub, Hanspeter; Junkins, John L. (2014). Analytical Mechanics of Space Systems, third edition. American Institute of Aeronautics and Astronautics.
- Schaub, Hanspeter; Junkins, John L. (2018). Analytical Mechanics of Space Systems, fourth edition. American Institute of Aeronautics and Astronautics.
- Schaub, Hanspeter; Junkins, John L. (2026). Analytical Mechanics of Space Systems, fifth edition. American Institute of Aeronautics and Astronautics. ISBN 978-1-62410-760-3. doi:10.2514/4.107597.

=== Selected journal publications ===
- Kelly, P.; Majji, M.; Junkins, J. L. (2023). "Stable Nonlinear Feedback Control Using Quaternionic Orbital Elements." Journal of Guidance, Control, and Dynamics, 46(11), 2192–2198.
- Peterson, J.; Arya, V.; Junkins, J. L. (2023). "Connecting the Equinoctial Elements and Rodrigues Parameters: A New Set of Elements." Journal of Guidance, Control, and Dynamics, 46(9), 1726–1744.
- Kelly, P.; Junkins, J. L.; Majji, M. (2023). "Orthogonal Approximation of Invariant Manifolds in the Circular Restricted Three-Body Problem." Journal of Guidance, Control, and Dynamics, 46(8), 1536–1547.
- Arya, V.; Goyal, R.; Majji, M.; Junkins, J. L. (2023). "Linear Quadratic Regulator Weighting Matrices for Output Covariance Assignment in Nonlinear Systems." Journal of Guidance, Control, and Dynamics, 46(2), 264–276.
- Yamamoto, K.; Junkins, J. L. (2026). "Advances in High Precision Partial Derivative Approximation for Functions of n Variables." The Journal of the Astronautical Sciences, 73, article 39. doi:10.1007/s40295-026-00585-z.

=== Selected conference publications ===
- Junkins, John L.; Turner, James D. (1980). "Optimal Large Angle Maneuvers With Simultaneous Shape Control/Vibration Arrest." Goddard Space Flight Center Flight Mechanics Symposium, pp. 201–214.
- Griffith, D. Todd; Junkins, John L.; Turner, James D. (2004). "Automatic Generation and Integration of Equations of Motion for Linked Mechanical Systems." Sixth International Conference on Dynamics and Control of Systems and Structures in Space.
- Arya, V.; Woollands, R.; Junkins, J. L. (2024). "Indirect Based Shadow Modelling with Warm-Up Time for Perturbed Orbit." Proceedings of the 44th Annual American Astronautical Society Guidance, Navigation, and Control Conference, pp. 383–398.
- Kelly, P.; Majji, M.; Junkins, J. L. (2024). "Multiplicative Quaternion Error Feedback for Orbital Maneuvers." Proceedings of the 44th Annual American Astronautical Society Guidance, Navigation, and Control Conference, pp. 775–792.

== Personal life ==
Junkins married Elouise Click in 1965. They have two children.

== See also ==
- Hagler Institute for Advanced Study
- Texas A&M University
- Astrodynamics
- Spacecraft attitude control
- 5964 Johnjunkins
