= Robert D. Braun =

American engineer and academic

Doctor Robert D. Braun
- Braun in 2021
- Born: Robert David Braun; United States
- Education: Pennsylvania State University (B.S., 1987); George Washington University (M.S., 1989); Stanford University (Ph.D., 1996)
- Occupations: Engineer; academic; scientist
- Scientific career
- Fields: Astrodynamics, Hypersonics, EDL
- Workplaces: Jet Propulsion Laboratory; California Institute of Technology; University of Colorado Boulder; Georgia Institute of Technology
- Thesis: Collaborative Optimization: An Architecture for Large-Scale Distributed Design (1996)
- Doctoral advisor: Ilan M. Kroo

Robert David Braun is an American aerospace engineer and academic. He has served as the dean of the College of Engineering and Applied Science at the University of Colorado Boulder, the David and Andrew Lewis Professor of Space Technology at the Georgia Institute of Technology, and the NASA Chief Technologist. Currently, Dr. Braun is the Space Sector Head at the Johns Hopkins Applied Physics Laboratory (APL).

== Education ==
Braun received his B.S. in aerospace engineering from Pennsylvania State University, his M.S. in astronautics from George Washington University, and his Ph.D. in aeronautics and astronautics from Stanford University. He has worked on a variety of advanced planetary exploration concepts at the NASA Langley Research Center from 1987-2003. He worked on the Mars Pathfinder mission from 1992–1997.

== Career ==
He joined the faculty of Georgia Tech in 2003, and was the founding director of the university's Center for Space Technology Research. In early 2010, NASA Administrator Charles F. Bolden, Jr. appointed Braun as the Agency's Chief Technologist. In this capacity, he created and staffed the NASA Office of the Chief Technologist, formulated the NASA Space Technology program and advocated for the budget necessary to advance cutting-edge technology applicable to NASA's future missions. Braun served in the position for 20 months before announcing his resignation and returning to Georgia Tech.

In 2012, Braun and SpaceWorks CEO John Olds founded Terminal Velocity Aerospace. The company, a design and hardware manufacturing organization, focused on orbital reentry devices and entry system technology. Braun sold his share of the business in 2015; it is now a subsidiary of SpaceWorks.

Braun served as the Moore Distinguished Scholar at Caltech in 2015.

Braun was named dean of the University of Colorado Boulder College of Engineering and Applied Science in 2016, beginning in the position on January 3, 2017. He stepped down from the role in January 2020 to begin employment at the Jet Propulsion Laboratory before joining APL in March 2022.

== Honors and distinctions ==
- American Institute of Aeronautics and Astronautics Lawrence Sperry Award, 1999
- National Air and Space Museum Trophy, 1998, presented to the Mars Pathfinder team
- NASA Exceptional Achievement Medal, 1996 and 1998.
- NASA Group Achievement Award (9 times)
- Fellow, American Institute of Aeronautics and Astronautics, 2007
- NASA Distinguished Service Medal, 2011
- AIAA von Karman Astronautics Lectureship, 2011
- Alvin Seiff Memorial Award, 2012
- American Astronautical Society Space Technology Award in 2014
- Elected to the National Academy of Engineering in 2014

== Selected publications ==
- Braun, R.D.; and Manning, R.M.; "Mars Entry, Descent and Landing Challenges," Journal of Spacecraft and Rockets, Vol. 44, No. 2, pp. 310–323, Mar-Apr, 2007.
- Dubos, G.F.; Saleh, J.H.; and Braun. R.D.: "Technology Readiness Level, Schedule Risk, and Slippage in Spacecraft Design." Journal of Spacecraft and Rockets, Vol. 45, No. 4, pp. 836–842, July-Aug, 2008.
- Clark, I.M.; Hutchings, A.L.; Tanner, C.L.; and Braun, R.D.: "Supersonic Inflatable Aerodynamic Decelerators for Use on Future Robotic Missions to Mars." Journal of Spacecraft and Rockets, Vol. 46, No. 2, pp. 340–352, Mar-Apr, 2009.
- Korzun, A.M.; Braun, R.D.; and Cruz, J.R.; "A Survey of Supersonic Retropropulsion Technology for Mars Entry, Descent and Landing," Journal of Spacecraft and Rockets, Vol. 46, No. 5, pp. 929–937, Sept-Oct, 2009.
- Theisinger, J.E.; and Braun, R.D.; "Multi-Objective Hypersonic Entry Aeroshell Shape Optimization," Journal of Spacecraft and Rockets, Vol. 46, No. 5, pp. 957–966, Sept-Oct, 2009.
- Grant, M.J.; Steinfeldt, B.A.; Matz, D.M.; Braun, R.D.; and Barton, G.H.; "Smart Divert – A New Entry, Descent and Landing Architecture." Journal of Spacecraft and Rockets, Vol. 47, No. 3, pp. 385–393, May–June, 2010.
- Putnam, Z.R.; and Braun, R.D.; "Precision Landing at Mars Using Discrete-Event Drag Modulation," Journal of Spacecraft and Rockets, Vol. 51, No. 1, pp. 128–138, Jan-Feb, 2014.
