= David Miller (engineer) =

American aerospace engineer

Professor David W. Miller
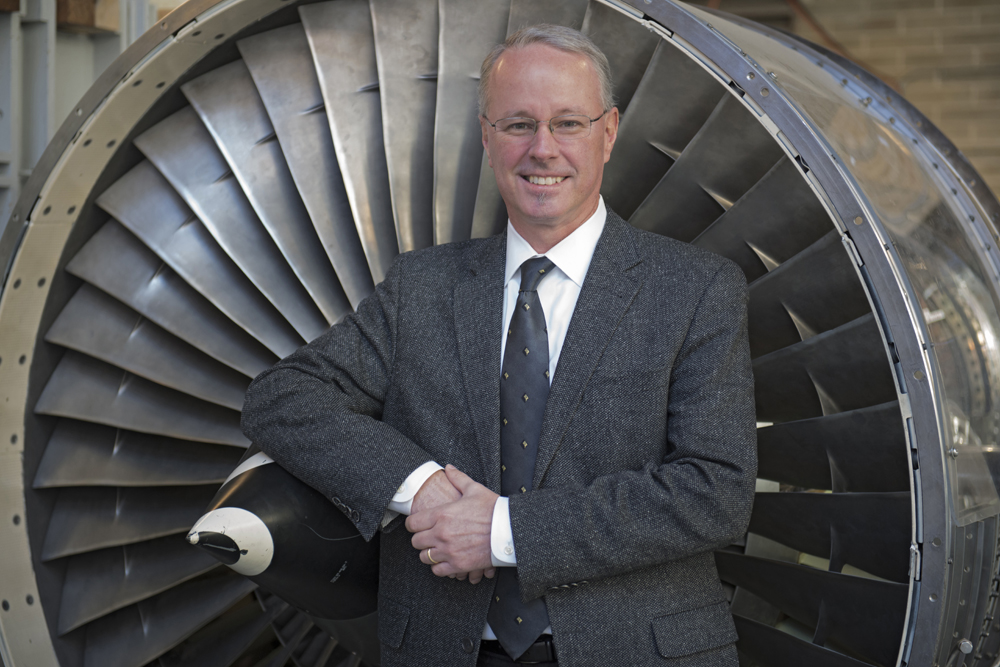
- Dr. Dave Miller posing in front of an airplane engine
- Education: Massachusetts Institute of Technology
- Engineering career
- Discipline: Aeronautics & Astronautics
- Institutions: Massachusetts Institute of Technology; NASA
- Employer: Jet Propulsion Laboratory
- Projects: SPHERES

David W. Miller is an American aerospace engineer who is the current Jerome Hunsaker Professor of Aeronautics and Astronautics at Massachusetts Institute of Technology and an elected Fellow of the American Institute of Aeronautics and Astronautics since 2015. He is currently on a leave of absence from MIT to be the Technologist for the Astronomy and Physics Directorate at NASA's Jet Propulsion Laboratory. Previously, he served three years as a VP and the Chief Technology Officer to The Aerospace Corporation. He has worked on multiple NASA projects and served as NASA chief technologist at NASA headquarters in Washington, DC.

== Early life and education ==
Miller received both undergraduate and graduate degrees in aeronautical and astronautical engineering at MIT.

== MIT professor ==
After graduation in 1988, Miller became a research associate for MIT's Aero/Astro. He was promoted to principal research scientist and assistant professor before becoming an associate professor in 1997.

He flew experiments on the Space Shuttle, including STS-48, STS-62, and STS-67 missions.

He is faculty for and the former director of the Space Systems Laboratory (MIT). Much of the research has focused on reconfigurable spacecraft concepts and on-orbit operations.

The laboratory has many research projects, include the SPHERES testbed on the International Space Station. The projects have also been on the JWST Product Integrity Team, and the NASA CubeSat Launch Initiative.

He worked with the United States Air Force to create fully funded graduate scholarships for graduates of the USAF Academy's FalconSAT program.

== NASA career ==
He served as the NASA chief technologist from 2014 to 2017.

He was the principal investigator for the Regolith X-ray Imaging Spectrometer (REXIS) for the OSIRIS-REx asteroid sample return mission, which launched in 2016.

He has been an advisor to or on steering committees for a variety of NASA projects:

- Space Infrared Interferometric Telescope (SPIRIT) of GFSC
- In-Space Assembled Telescope (iSAT) Study of JPL

As of 2025, he works as the technologist for the Astronomy and Physics Directorate at NASA's Jet Propulsion Laboratory.

== Industry positions ==
Miller was selected in 2018 to be the vice president and chief technology officer (CTO) of The Aerospace Corporation.

He spent five years on the Air Force scientific advisory board, two of them as the vice chair.
