= Electromagnetic formation flight =

Method of controlling spacecraft

Electromagnetic formation flight (EMFF) investigates the concept of using electromagnets coupled with reaction wheels in place of more traditional propulsion systems to control the positions and attitudes of a number of spacecraft in close proximity. Unlike traditional propulsion systems, which use exhaustible propellants that often limit lifetime, the EMFF system uses solar power to energize a magnetic field. The Massachusetts Institute of Technology Space Systems Laboratory is exploring this concept by developing dynamics and control models as well as an experimental testbed for their validation.

== How it works ==
The magnetic fields for EMFF are generated by sending current through coils of wire. The interaction between the magnetic dipoles created is easily understood with a far field approximation where the separation distance between two vehicles is large compared to the physical size of the dipole. By controlling the dipoles on various vehicles, attraction, repulsion, and shear forces can be created. Combined with reaction wheels, any desired maneuver can be performed as long as the formation’s center of mass is not required to change.

== Applications ==
The EMFF system is most applicable in cases where multiple spacecraft are free-flying relative to one another and there is no need to control the center of mass of the system. NASA’s Terrestrial Planet Finder (TPF) mission and space telescope assembly are just two such types of missions. EMFF provides the foremost advantage of reduced dependence on consumables. In addition, it eliminates thruster plumes and enhances the capability of replacing a failed element more economically.

== Testbed ==
The MIT-SSL constructed two EMFF testbed vehicles for demonstrating control of 2-D formations on a large flat floor. Vehicles are suspended on a frictionless air carriage and are completely self-contained using RF communications, microprocessors, and a metrology system. Liquid Nitrogen maintains cryogenic temperatures and batteries provide the power to the high-temperature superconductive (HTS) coils. The testbed has demonstrated control of the relative degrees of freedom (DOF) in open loop and closed loop control using linearized controllers and a nonlinear sliding mode controller.

== Awards ==
Former Space Systems Lab associate director Dr. Raymond Sedwick (now at the University of Maryland, College Park) has been awarded the first Bepi Colombo Prize for a paper on electromagnetic formation flight. According to Aero-Astro Professor Manuel Martinez-Sanchez, who worked with Colombo and was a juror in the competition, "The jury was unanimous in that Ray's paper best represented 'Bepi' Colombo's spirit of innovation and originality, combined with rigor."

== Collaborators ==
Research on electromagnetic formation flight or similar projects is also ongoing at:

- The Institute of Space and Astronautical Science / JAXA
- Space Research Centre, Polish Academy of Sciences
- Michigan Technogical University on Colomb Force Spacecraft

== Other journal articles ==
- Elias, Laila M., Kwon, Daniel W., Sedwick, Raymond J., and Miller, David W., "Electromagnetic Formation Flight Dynamics including Reaction Wheel Gyroscopic Stiffening Effects" Journal of Guidance, Control, and Dynamics, Vol. 30, No. 2, Mar–Apr. 2007, pp. 499–511.
