= SPHERES =

Free-flying robotic system

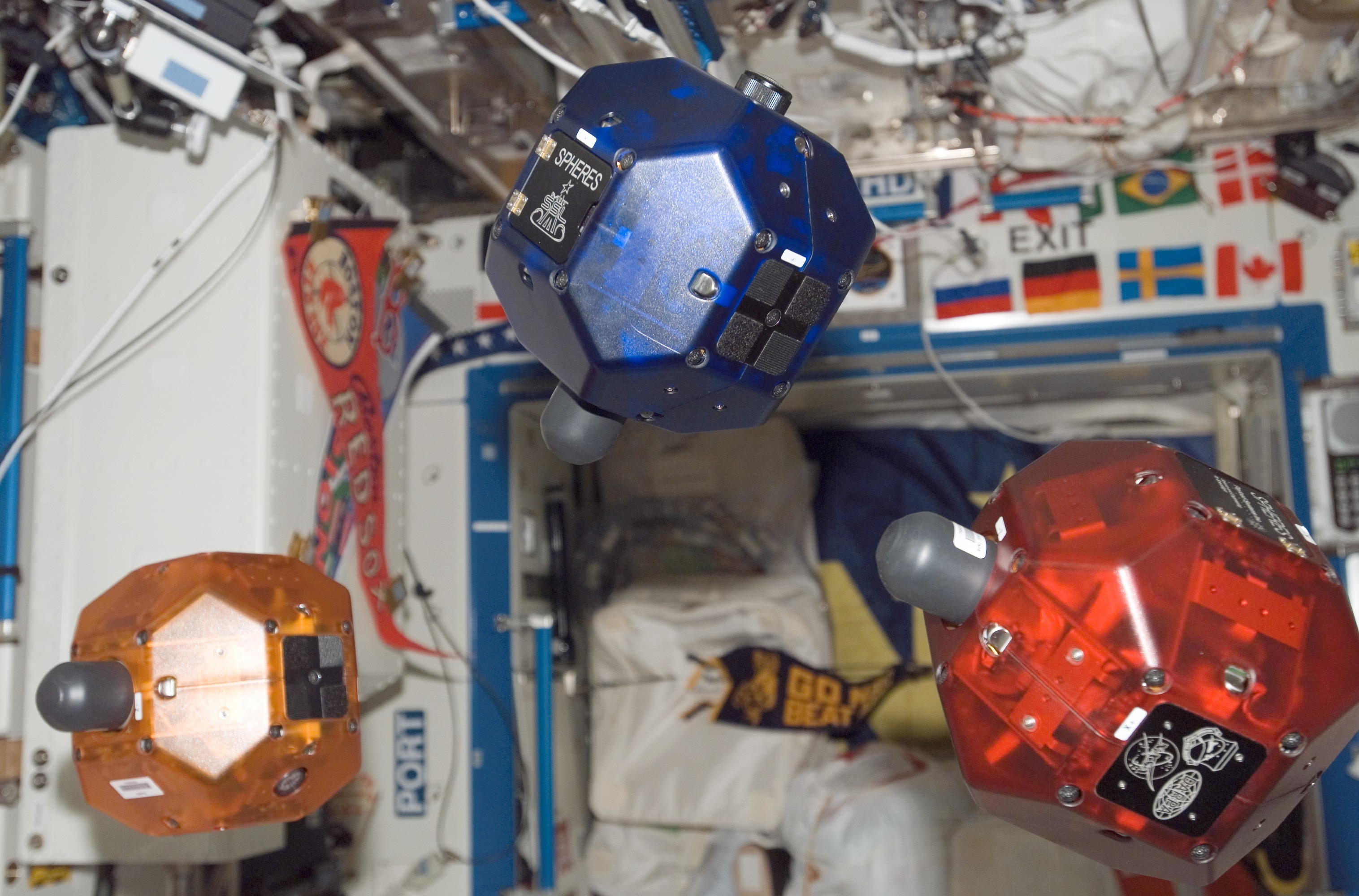
SPHERES aboard ISS

The Synchronized Position Hold Engage and Reorient Experimental Satellite (SPHERES) are a series of miniaturized satellites developed by MIT's Space Systems Laboratory for NASA and US Military, to be used as a low-risk, extensible test bed for the development of metrology, formation flight, rendezvous, docking and autonomy algorithms that are critical for future space missions that use distributed spacecraft architecture, such as Terrestrial Planet Finder and Orbital Express.

Each SPHERES satellite is an 18-sided polyhedron, with a mass of about 4.1 kg and a diameter of about 21 cm. They can be used in the International Space Station as well as in ground-based laboratories, but not in the vacuum of space. The battery-powered, self-contained units can operate semi-autonomously, using CO_{2}-based cold-gas thrusters for movement and a series of ultrasonic beacons for orientation. The satellites can communicate with each other and with a control station wirelessly. The built-in features of the satellites can be extended using an expansion port.

From 2006, three SPHERES units are being used in the International Space Station for a variety of experiments. The SPHERES Guest Scientist Program allow scientists to conduct new science experiments using SPHERES units, and the Zero Robotics Program allow students to participate in annual competitions that involve developing software to control SPHERES units.

The SPHERES program is expected to continue until 2017, and possibly further.

The SPHERES project led to a newer project called Astrobee.

== Development ==
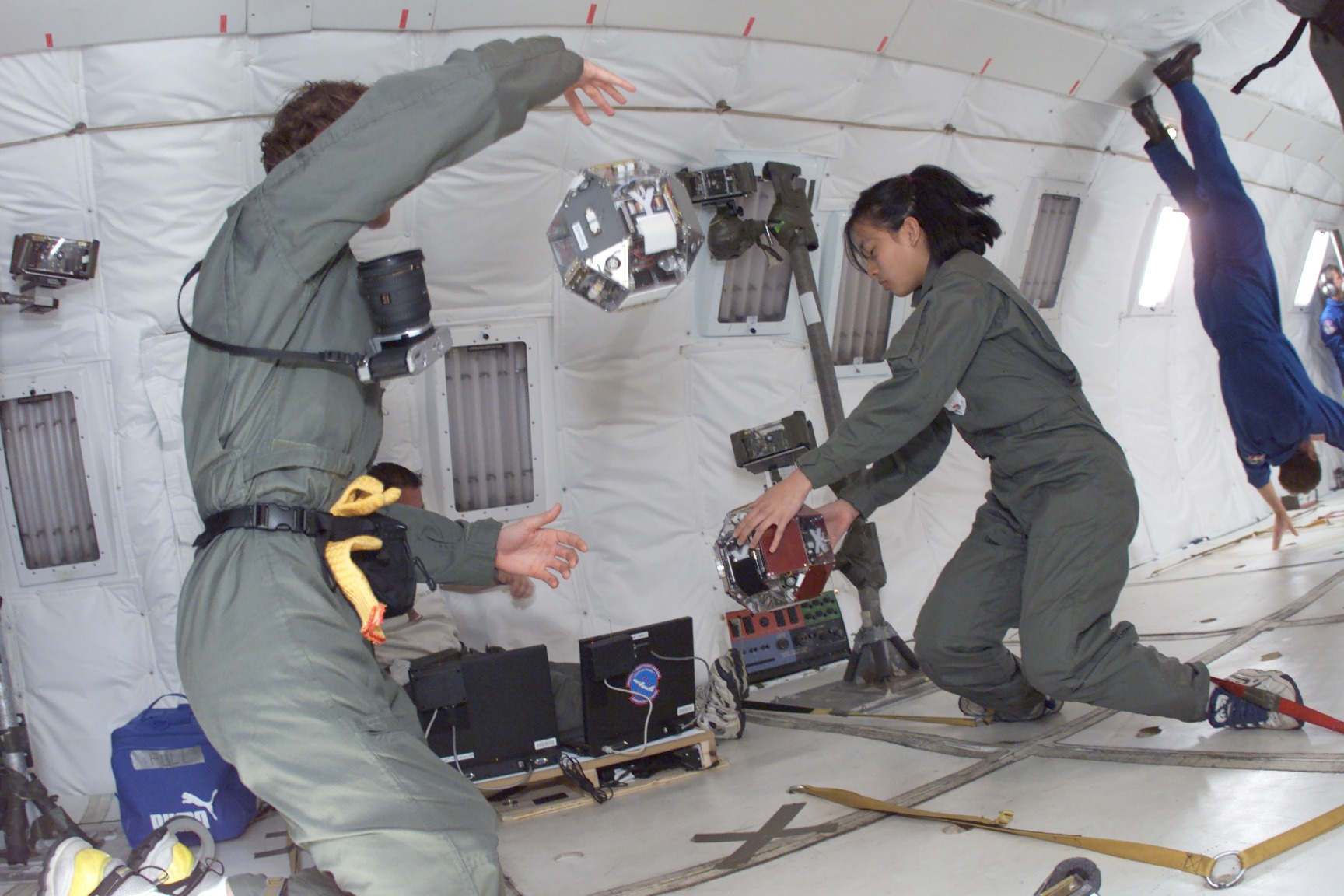
MIT students test the SPHERES satellites aboard NASA's reduced gravity aircraft.

The initial development of SPHERES started in 1999, by a team of students at Massachusetts Institute of Technology, as part of an aerospace engineering program. The concept of the satellite was conceived when Professor David Miller challenged the students to develop a device similar to the combat training remote seen in the 1977 movie Star Wars Episode IV: A New Hope and more recently in Star Wars: Episode II – Attack of the Clones. Several prototypes were developed during the course of the program, and were tested in ground laboratories as well as in parabolic flights using NASA's reduced gravity aircraft.

After the initial development, the SPHERES program was taken over by MIT's Space Systems Laboratory. In collaboration with Aurora Flight Sciences, the design was refined and six flight-ready satellites were built, out of which three were delivered to the International Space Station.

The SPHERES project is primarily funded by Defense Advanced Research Projects Agency (DARPA).

== Specifications ==
=== Structure and physical characteristics ===
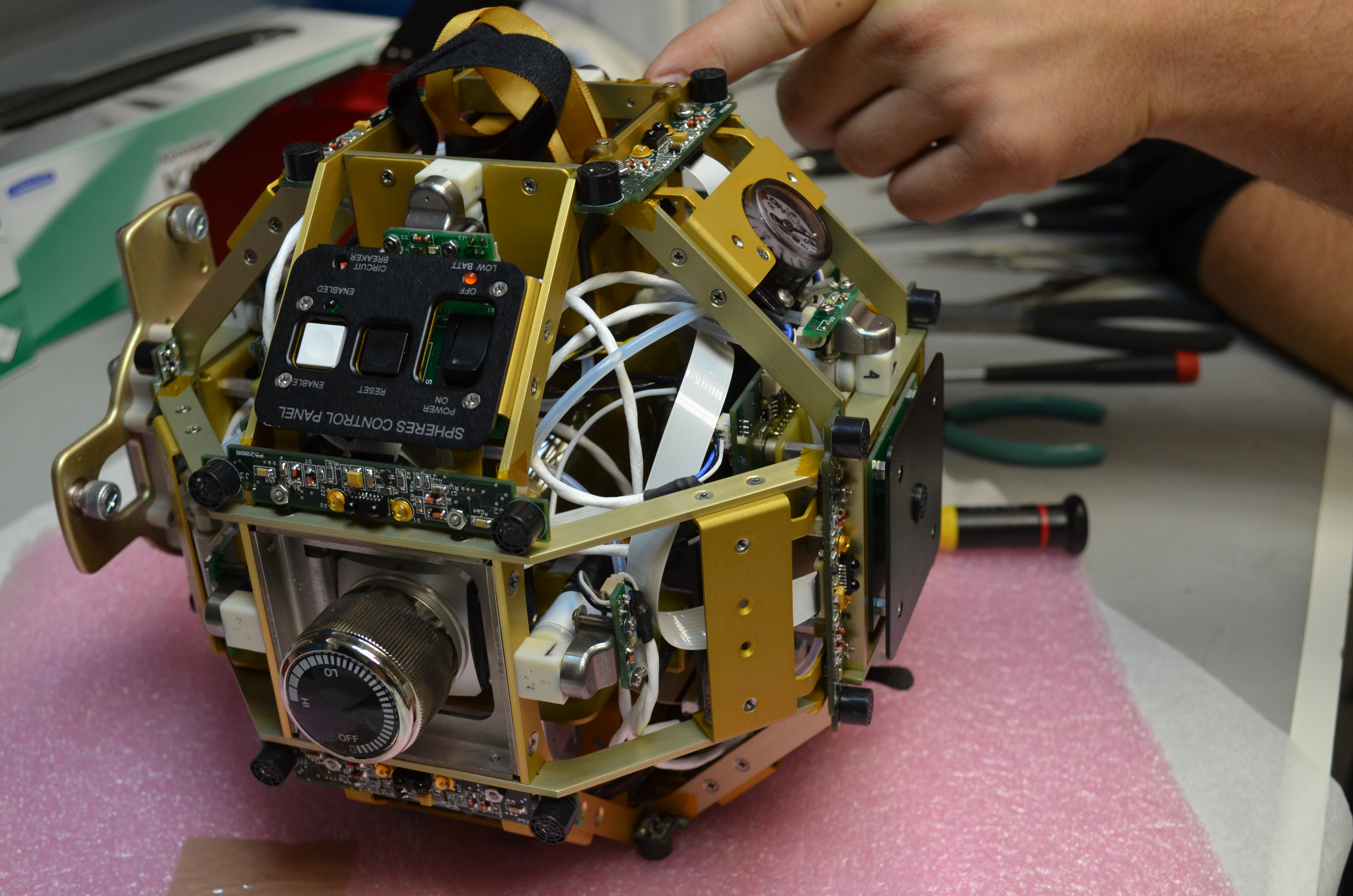
A SPHERES satellite without the plastic shell. Aluminum structure, a control panel, ultrasonic sensors, thrusters, pressure regulator knob and pressure gauge are visible.

Each SPHERES satellite resembles an 18-sided polyhedron, similar to a cuboctahedron. The aluminum structure of the satellite is enclosed in a semi-transparent plastic shell. The shell is red, blue, orange or black in color, to help with easy identification. The three satellites in the International Space Station are red, blue and orange. Each unit has a maximum diameter of 22.9 cm and has a mass of 4.16 kg including the consumables.

=== Processing and communication ===
A Texas Instruments C6701 DSP running at 167 MHz serves as the onboard computer. Flight software and experiment related instructions are written in C programming language.

The satellites can communicate with each other using a 916.5 MHz, 16 kbit/s radio link. Communication with the control station (a laptop computer) is done using an 868.35 MHz, 16 kbit/s radio link. SPHERES satellites are able to connect to the International Space Station's on-board Wi-Fi network for tasks that require a higher data bandwidth.

=== Sensors and navigation ===
SPHERES satellites determine their position and attitude by using 23 on-board ultrasonic receivers (Murata MA40S4R) and 5 external ultrasonic reference beacons. The ultrasonic time-of-flight measurements from the external beacons to the on-board receivers are used to calculate the satellite's position with respect to the external reference frame.

For rapid determination of position, the ultrasonic time-of-flight information is supplemented with the data from on-board accelerometers (3x Honeywell QA-750 single-axis accelerometers) and gyroscopes (3x Systron Donner QRS14 single-axis rate gyroscopes).

=== Power and actuation ===
SPHERES satellites are powered using two non-rechargeable 12v battery packs. Each battery pack consists of eight 1.5v AA battery cells that are spot-welded in series.

The satellites are able to translate in the micro-gravity environment with 6 degrees-of-freedom, using twelve cold-gas thrusters that use liquid CO_{2} as propellant. The liquid CO_{2} are stored in a small on-board container, similar to those that are used in paintball guns. The CO_{2} is converted to a gaseous state before being ejected through the thrusters for propulsion. Desired thrust is achieved through pulse modulation of thrust solenoids.

The maximum linear acceleration of the satellites is 0.17m/s2, with an accuracy of 0.5 cm. The maximum angular acceleration is 3.5 rad/s2, with an accuracy of 2.5 degrees.

== Testing and support facilities ==
SPHERES program utilizes supporting facilities located at NASA's Ames Research Centre.

=== 3 DoF Laboratory ===
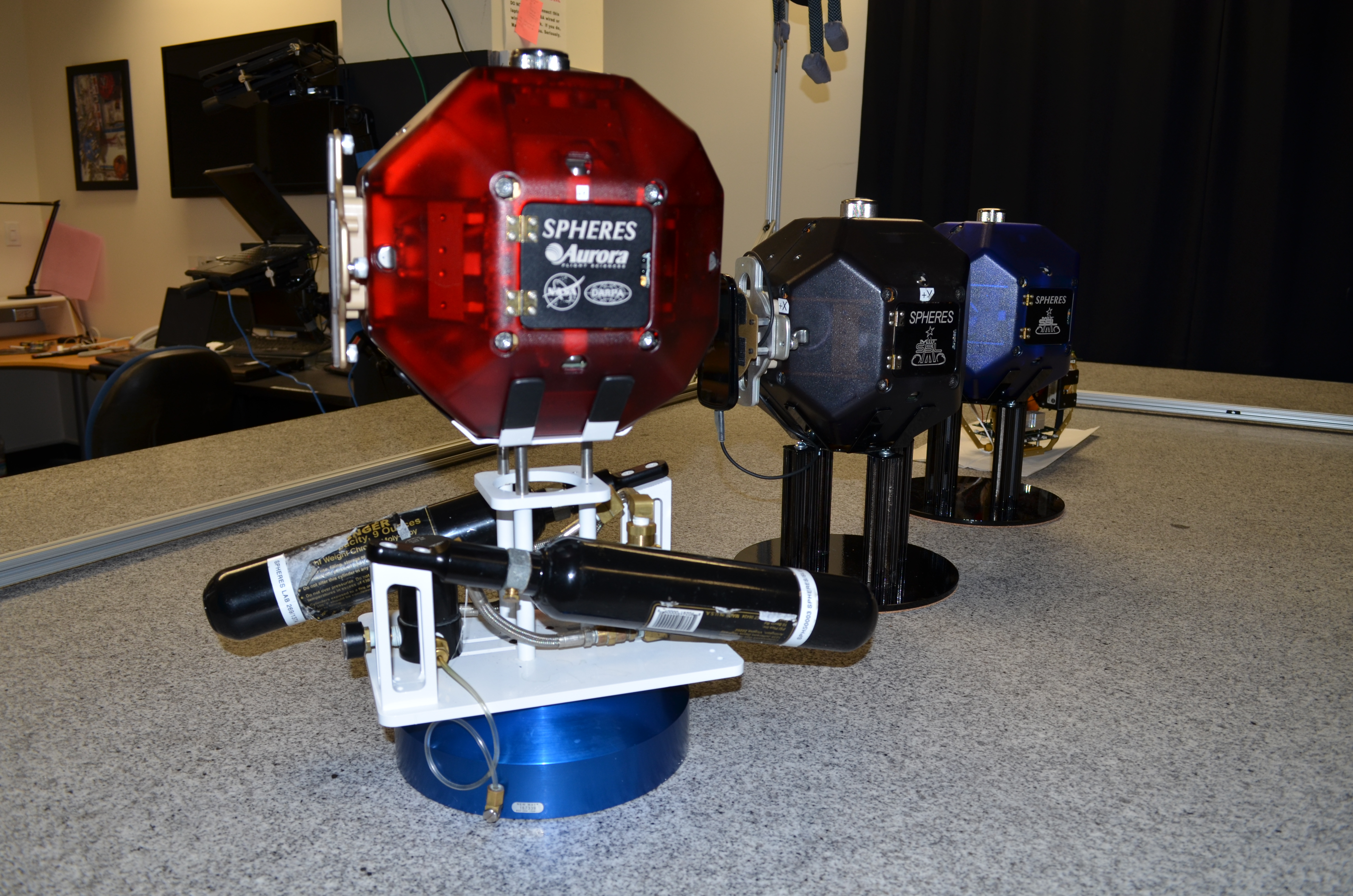
A SPHERES satellite is mounted on an air carriage at the 3 DoF laboratory.

The 3 DoF laboratory facilitates simultaneous testing of up to three SPHERES satellites on a flat, nearly friction-less granite surface. The satellites are mounted on air carriages – stands that eject a stream of CO_{2} to create a cushion of air – allowing the units to translate on X and Y axis, and rotate on Z axis.

=== MicroGravity Test Facility (MGTF) ===
The MicroGravity Test Facility (MGTF) facilitates testing of a single mobile SPHERES satellite, using six degrees-of-freedom. In this, the unit is held by a gimbal with 3 DoF, which is suspended from a translation crane with 3 DoF. The laboratory is able to provide a navigational reference frame in a similar configuration as in the International Space Station using five ultrasonic beacons, and the output of cold gas thrusters are analysed to simulate the expected movement in a micro-gravity environment.

=== Flight Assembly Laboratory ===
The Flight Assembly Laboratory is used to prepare and test consumables – battery packs and liquid CO_{2} containers – used by the SPHERES units.

Individual cells of the battery packs are tested, spot-welded in series and tested again as a pack. The battery packs are discarded after use.

Spent CO_{2} containers are returned to the Flight Assembly Laboratory for re-filling and safety testing before being flown back to the International Space Station.

== Delivery to the International Space Station ==
The delivery of SPHERES satellites to the International Space Station were originally planned for 2003. However, due to the loss of Space Shuttle Columbia in February 2003, the delivery did not take place until 2006.

The first SPHERES unit was delivered to ISS by the unmanned resupply mission Progress M-56 (ISS-21P) during April 2006. The second unit was delivered by the Space Shuttle mission STS-121 in July 2006. The final unit was delivered by the Space Shuttle mission STS-116 in December 2006.

The SPHERES experiment aboard the International Space Station commenced on 18 May 2006.

== Experiments ==
=== SmartSPHERES ===
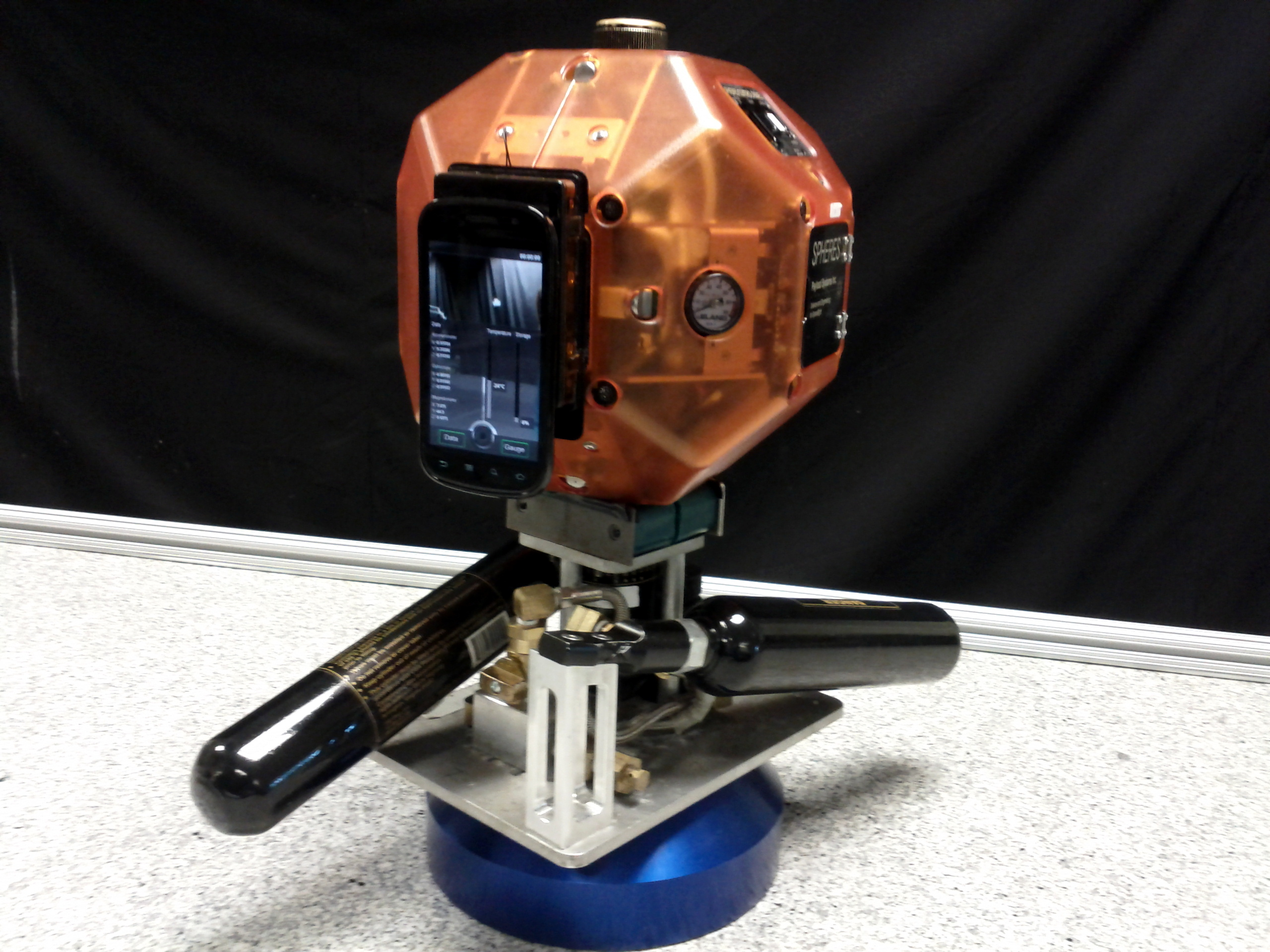
A smartphone-equipped SPHERES satellite.

SmartSPHERES experiment equipped the three SPHERES satellite aboard the International Space Station with Nexus S smartphones that were delivered via the Space Shuttle mission STS-135. Each satellite was enhanced through the use of processing power, wireless networking, camera, sensors and the touch sensitive display of the connected smartphone. The availability of the Android operating system's source code enabled the devices to be used as a compact, low-cost, low-power computers.

The experiment studies the use of SPHERES satellites to conduct autonomous and remotely operated environmental and inventory surveys aboard the Space Station, with the aim of reducing the astronaut's time spent on routine tasks. Knowledge gained will also help the development of future space vehicles that could perform extravehicular activities, and assist astronauts with their tasks.

The SmartSPHERES experiment is managed by the Intelligent Robotics Group of the Ames Research Center with funding from Enabling Technology Development and Demonstration program of NASA's Exploration Systems Mission Directorate.

=== SPHERES-VERTIGO ===
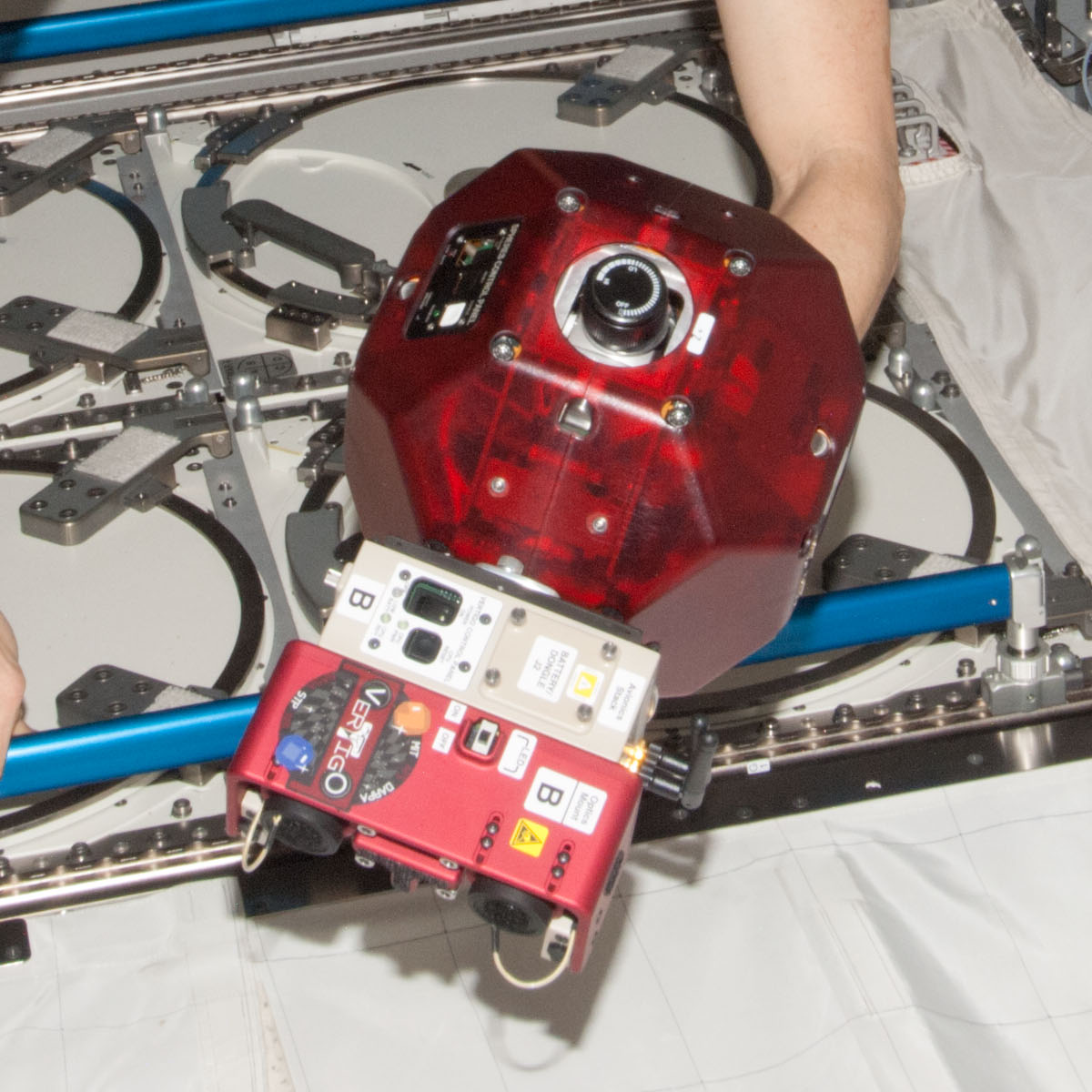
A SPHERES satellite equipped with add-on VERTIGO goggles.

The SPHERES-VERTIGO (SPHERES-Visual Estimation and Relative Tracking for Inspection of Generic Objects) experiment aims to develop software and hardware that can generate three-dimensional maps of cooperative or non-cooperative objects using computer vision, and navigate relative to such objects solely by reference to the generated maps.

As part of the experiment, new Simultaneous Localization and Mapping (SLAM) algorithms are developed and tested.

To facilitate SPHERES-VERTIGO experiment, each SPHERES satellite aboard the ISS are equipped with an add-on "goggle" – a device connected to SPHERES using the expansion port, and carries a stereo camera, ultrasonic sensors, a single-board computer, high-speed communication facilities and batteries.

Technologies developed will be used in future autonomous space vehicles that can operate alone or in groups to map asteroids, inspect tumbling satellites or de-orbit space debris.

The experiment is part of the SPHERES Integrated Research Experiments (InSPIRE) program, funded by DARPA.

=== DOD SPHERES-RINGS ===
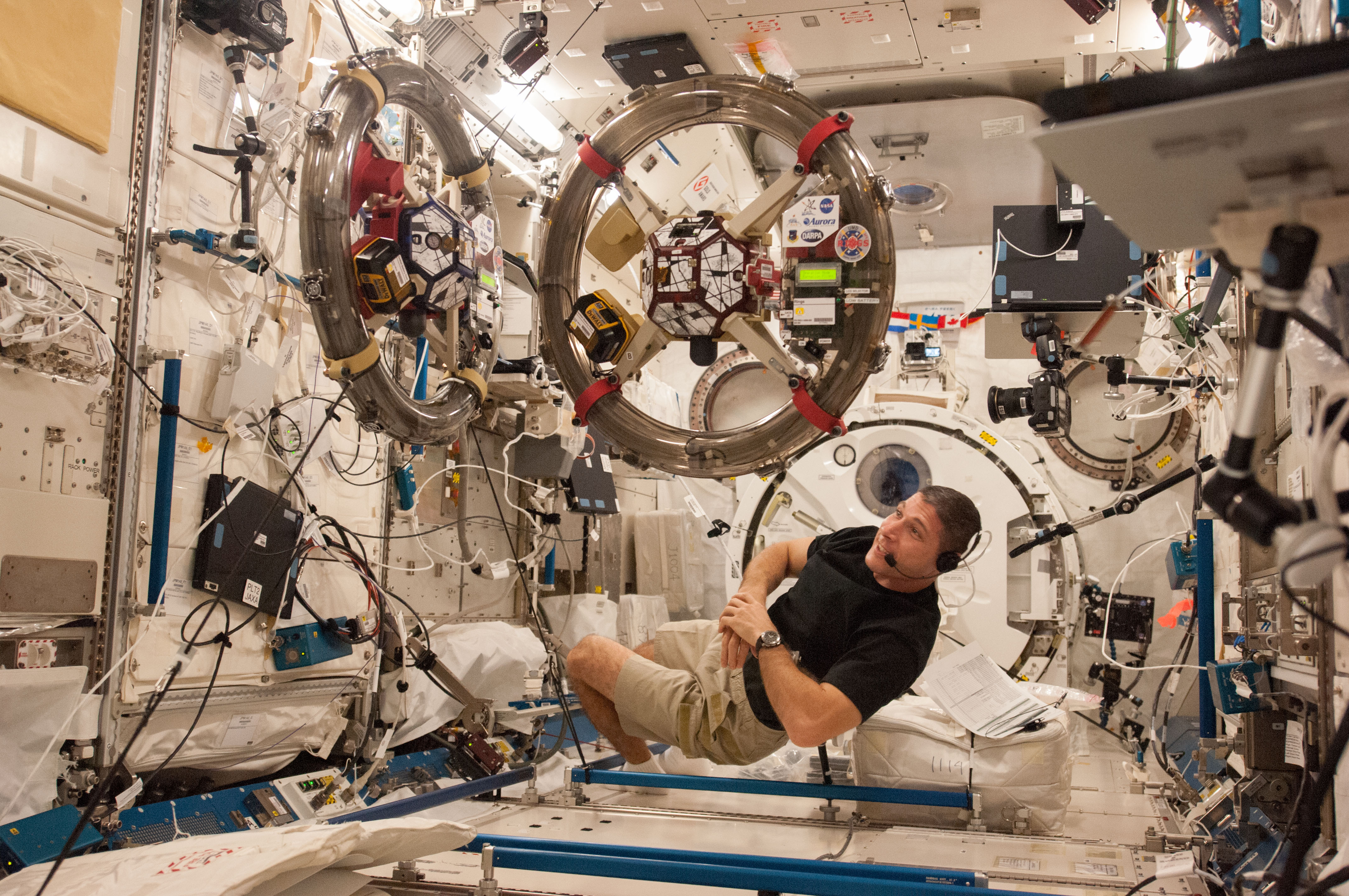
Two SPHERES satellites with the RINGS add-ons are being used in an experiment by NASA astronaut Michael Hopkins.

DOD SPHERES-RINGS (Department of Defense SPHERES-Resonant Inductive Near-field Generation System) experiment aims to develop software and hardware capable of Electromagnetic Formation Flight (EMFF) and wireless power transfer in microgravity environment.

The experiment uses two hardware assemblies connected to SPHERES satellites, consisting of aluminum resonant coils, coil housing with fans, electronics and batteries.

Individual SPHERES units are maneuvered with respect to each other by generating controlled attractive, repulsive and shear forces using the electromagnetic coils. The same coils are used to wirelessly transfer power between SPHERES satellites through resonant inductive coupling. Software algorithms that avoid collision between satellites are also developed as part of the experiment.

Knowledge gained through the experiment will help the development of propellant-free, plume-free clustered space vehicles, increase their operating lifetime, reduce spacecraft mass and associated operating risks.

=== SPHERES-Slosh ===
Article: SPHERES-Slosh

=== SPHERES-Halo ===
An expansion to the SPHERES satellites that forms a ring (halo) around the satellite to provide six expansion port attachment sites. Two were flown to the ISS.

=== SPHERES-Universal Docking Ports ===
Docking mechanism that enables two SPHERES satellites to attach rigidly together. Six were flown to the ISS.

== Use in education ==
=== Zero Robotics ===
Zero Robotics is an annual international programming competition conducted by the Massachusetts Institute of Technology (MIT), in partnership with NASA and other organizations. Student teams program robotic platforms to solve a specific challenge involving navigation and control in microgravity environments aboard the International Space Station (ISS).

Initially, the competition used the SPHERES (Synchronized Position Hold Engage and Reorient Experimental Satellites) robotic platforms—free-flying robots used inside the ISS for research on satellite formation flying and control algorithms. Although referred to as "satellites," SPHERES were not orbiting the Earth independently but operated exclusively within the microgravity environment of the ISS.

In recent years, the competition transitioned to using Astrobee robots, a newer generation of free-flying robotic assistants developed by NASA for autonomous operation on the ISS. (This change began around 2022, following the retirement of SPHERES in 2019). The Astrobee system provides enhanced capabilities including vision-based navigation and more advanced computing power.

The competition is held in two tiers: the middle school tournament and the high school tournament. Initial rounds take place in simulation, and the finalists' programs are uploaded to the robotic platforms aboard the ISS and executed in real time. The final event is broadcast live to audiences in the United States, Europe, and Australia.

== See also ==
- AERCam Sprint
- Artificial intelligence
- Astrobee (robot)
- Micro-g environment
- Robotics
- Electromagnetic Formation Flight
- Scientific research on the International Space Station
- Spherical robot
