= Winston (name) =

Winston is a surname derived from Winstone, near Cirencester in Gloucestershire. Later, it developed as a male Christian name with the Churchill family, starting with Sir Winston Churchill in 1620, named for his mother Sarah's surname.

== People with the surname ==
- Annie Steger Winston (1862-1927), American short story writer
- Arthur Winston (1906–2006), American centenarian, "Employee of the Century"
- Brian Winston (1941–2022), British journalist
- Cassius Winston (born 1998), American basketball player
- Charles Winston (1814–1864), English historian
- Charlie Winston (born 1978), English singer and songwriter
- Dallas Winston, fictional character from S. E. Hinton's The Outsiders
- Easop Winston (born 1996), American football player
- Emaree Winston (born 2006), American football player
- Eric Winston (born 1983), American football player
- Francis D. Winston (1857–1941), Lt. Governor of North Carolina
- George Winston (1949–2023), American pianist
- George T. Winston (1852–1932), American educator
- Harry Winston (1896–1978), American jeweller
- Henry Winston, (1911–1986), American civil rights activist
- Hattie Winston (born 1945), American actress
- Jameis Winston (born 1994), American football quarterback
- James Brown Winston (1820–1884), first medical officer of Los Angeles, California
- Jimmy Winston (1945–2020), British organist
- John A. Winston (1812–1871), American politician, governor of Alabama
- Joseph Winston (1746–1815), American politician
- Kevin Winston Jr. (born 2003), American football player
- Louis L. Winston (1784–1824), justice of the Supreme Court of Mississippi
- Matt Winston (born 1970), American actor
- Nat T. Winston Jr., American psychiatrist
- Patrick Henry Winston
- Peter Winston (1958–78), American chess player
- Piney Winston, fictional biker gang member from Sons of Anarchy
- Randall Winston, American television producer
- Robert Winston, Baron Winston (born 1940), British scientist, politician and TV presenter
- Robert Winston (coach) (1847–1913), American football coach
- Robert Watson Winston (1860–1944), North Carolina lawyer and historian
- Roland Winston (1936–2025), American scientist in the field of nonimaging optics
- Roy Winston (1940–2022), American football player
- Roy Winston (poker player), American poker player
- Stan Winston (1946–2008), American special effects and makeup artist

== People with the given name ==
=== Actors ===
- Winston Rekert (1949–2012), Canadian actor
- Winston Duke (born 1986), Tobagonian actor
- Winston Ntshona (1941–2018), South African playwright and actor
- Winston Saunders (1941–2006), Bahamian actor
- Winston Doty (1914–1934), child actor
- Winston Chao (born 1960), Taiwanese actor
- Winston Miller (1910–1994), American actor
- Winston Hibler (1910–1976), American actor
- Winston Spear (born 1965), Canadian stand-up comedian and actor
- Winston Stona (1940–2022), Jamaican actor and businessman
- Winston Severn (born 1942), American former cricketer and child screen actor

=== Musicians ===
- Winston Blake (1940–2016), Jamaican sound system operator
- Winston Francis (born 1948), Jamaican singer
- Winston Giles (born 1974), Australian musician
- Winston Grennan (1944–2000), Jamaican drummer
- Winston Hauschild (born 1973), Canadian record producer
- Winston Jarrett (born 1940), Jamaican reggae singer
- Winston Marshall (born 1988), British musician
- Winston McAnuff (born 1957), Jamaican singer
- Winston Hubert McIntosh (1944–1987), Jamaican musician, stage name Peter Tosh
- Winston Mankunku Ngozi (1943–2009), South African tenor saxophone player
- Winston Reedy (born 1950), Jamaican reggae singer
- Winston Riley (1943–2012), Jamaican singer
- Winston Stewart (born 1947), stage name Delano Stewart
- Winston Tong (born 1951), American singer-songwriter
- Winston Walls, American jazz player
- Winston Wright (1944–1993), Jamaican keyboardist

=== Politicians ===
- Winston Baker (born 1939), Canadian politician
- Winston Cenac, civil servant and politician from Saint Lucia
- Winston Chitando, Zimbabwean politician
- Winston Churchill (1620–1688), English soldier, historian, politician
- Winston Churchill (1874–1965), British Prime Minister and statesman
- Winston Churchill (1940–2010), member of British Parliament; grandson of the former Prime Minister
- Winston Crane (born 1941), Australian politician
- Winston Dang (born 1943), Taiwanese politician
- Winston Dookeran (born 1943), Trinidadian politician and economist
- Winston Field (1904–1969), Rhodesian politician
- Winston Garcia (born 1958), Filipino politician
- Winston Green ( (1958/1959–2017), Jamaican politician and dentist
- Winston Jessurun (born 1952), Surinamese politician
- Winston V. Jones (born 1917), Jamaican politician
- Winston Lackin (1954–2019), Surinamese politician and diplomat
- Winston Lord (born 1937), American diplomat
- Winston McKenzie (born 1953), British political activist
- Winston Peters (born 1945), New Zealand politician
- Winston Pond, geothermal activist and politician from Montserrat

=== Sports ===
- Winston Abraham (born 1974), Australian footballer
- Winston Anglin (1962–2004), Jamaican international footballer
- Winston Bakboord (born 1971), Dutch footballer
- Winston Bogarde (born 1970), Dutch retired footballer
- Winston Campbell (born 1991), Honduran discus thrower
- Winston Craig (born 1995), American football player
- Winston DeLattiboudere III (born 1998), American football player and coach
- Winston DuBose, retired American soccer goalkeeper
- Winston Earle, retired Jamaican footballer
- Winston Faerber (born 1971), Dutch-Surinamese former professional footballer
- Winston Foster (born 1941), English former footballer
- Winston Griffiths (1978–2011), Jamaican footballer
- Winston Justice (born 1984), American NFL football player
- Winston Kalengo (born 1985), Zambian footballer
- Winston Lee (born 1994), Jamaican-born American former collegiate athlete
- Winston Mhango (born 1988), Zimbabwean footballer
- Winston October (born 1976), Canadian football player
- Winston Parks (born 1981), Costa Rican former footballer
- Winston Reid (cricketer) (born 1962), Barbadian cricket player
- Winston Reid (born 1988), New Zealand born footballer
- Winston Santos (born 1968), Venezuelan wrestler
- Winston Santos (baseball) (born 2002), Dominican baseball player
- Winston Smith (born 1982), Jamaican track and field sprinter
- Winston Stanley (born 1974), Canadian rugby union footballer
- Winston Stanley (born 1989), Australian-born Samoan former rugby union footballer
- Winston Watkins (born 2007), American football player
- Winston Watts (born 1967), member of the Jamaica national bobsleigh team
- Winston Wright Jr. (born 2001), American football player

=== Other ===
- Winston Chu (born 1940), Hong Kong lawyer and activist
- Winston Churchill (novelist) (1871–1947), American novelist
- Winston Chow, American student activist
- Winston De Ville (1937–2025), American historian
- Winston Graham (1908–2003), English novelist
- Winston Groom (1943–2020), American novelist, author of Forrest Gump
- Winston Churchill Rea, former leader of the Red Hand Commando (RHC) loyalist paramilitary organisation in Northern Ireland
- Winston E. Scott (born 1950), American astronaut
- Winston M. Scott (1909–1971), American CIA officer
- Winston L. Shelton (1922-2019), American inventor and entrepreneur
- Winston Smith (born 1952), American artist and illustrator

== Fictional characters ==
- Winston (Dennis the Menace), a bully in the 1980s Dennis the Menace animated television series
- Winston (EastEnders)
- Winston (Overwatch)
- Winston Bishop, a character in New Girl
- Winston Chu (Degrassi character) in Degrassi: The Next Generation
- Winston Ingram, a pensioner in BBC's Still Game
- Winston Payne, an early and recurring antagonist in the Ace Attorney video game series
- Winston Schmidt, a character in New Girl
- Winston Smith, from the novel Nineteen Eighty-Four by George Orwell
- Winston Zeddemore, a character in Ghostbusters

== Animals ==
- Winston (horse), a British mounted police horse ridden by Queen Elizabeth II
- Winston, Princess Chelsea's cat featured in multiple music videos, in her album artwork for Lil' Golden Book, and vocals in her song "Winston Crying on the Bathroom Floor".

== See also ==
- Whinston
- Winston (disambiguation)
- Winstone (surname)
