= Winston Scott =

Winston Scott may refer to:

== People ==
- Winston E. Scott (born 1950), NASA astronaut
- Winston M. Scott (1909–1971), FBI agent, OSS operative, CIA officer
- Sir Arleigh Winston Scott GCMG GCVO (1900–1976), Governor General of Barbados
- Joseph Winston Scott (born 1965), U.S. basketball coach

== Fictional characters ==
- Winston Scott, a fictional character from the John Wick franchise, the manager of The Continental New York City
- Winston Scott, a fictional character from the 2008 film Contract Killers

== See also ==
- Winston "Scotty" Fitzgerald (1914–1987), Canadian musician, Cape Breton fiddler
- Scott Winston Colom (born 1982), U.S. lawyer
- All pages with titles containing "Winston" and "Scott"
- Winston (given name)
- Scott (surname)
- Winston (disambiguation)
- Scott (disambiguation)
