= Patrick Henry (disambiguation) =

Patrick Henry (1736–1799) was a Founding Father of the United States and of American Revolutionary War and governor of Virginia.

Patrick Henry may also refer to:

== People ==
- Patrick Henry (Mississippi politician) (1843–1930), American politician from Mississippi
- Pat Henry (politician) (1861–1933), American politician from Mississippi; nephew of the above
- Patrick Henry (murderer) (1953–2017), French child murderer subject to a famous trial in 1977
- Patrick T. Henry (born 1950), U.S. Assistant Secretary of the Army (1998–2001)
- Patrick Henry (Florida politician) (born 1954)

== Ships ==
- CSS Patrick Henry, a brigantine-rigged side-wheel steamer converted into a Confederate gunboat during the American Civil War
- SS Patrick Henry, the first World War II Liberty ship launched
- USS Patrick Henry (SSBN-599), a ballistic missile submarine of the United States Navy
- Patrick Henry (packet), a sailing ship between 1839 and 1864

== Schools ==
- Patrick Henry College, a private Christian college in Purcellville, Virginia
- Patrick Henry High School (disambiguation)
- Patrick Henry Middle School (disambiguation)

== Other uses ==
- Fort Patrick Henry, Vincennes, Indiana, an 18th-century fort
- Patrick Henry, one of the neighborhoods of Tulsa, Oklahoma
- Patrick Henry County, Virginia, a former county
- Camp Patrick Henry, Warwick County, Virginia, a decommissioned United States Army base
- Patrick Henry Building, Richmond, Virginia, on the National Register of Historic Places
- Patrick Henry Hotel, Roanoke, Virginia, a former hotel on the National Register of Historic Places
- Patrick Henry Mall, Newport News, Virginia, a shopping mall

== See also ==
- Patrick Henry Village, a United States Army family housing area in the vicinity of Heidelberg, Germany
- Patrick Henry Winston (disambiguation)
- Pat Henry (disambiguation)
- Patrick McHenry (born 1975), Speaker pro tempore of the United States House of Representatives
