= Henry High School =

Henry High School can refer to one of the following high schools in the United States:

- Henry-Senachwine High School, public high school in Henry, Illinois
- William W.M. Henry Comprehensive High School, former public high school in Dover, Delaware

== See also ==
- Patrick Henry High School (disambiguation), schools named after Patrick Henry
- Henry J. Kaiser High School, schools named after Henry J. Kaiser
