= NASA Astronaut Group 14 =

1992 human spaceflight selection of 23 candidates; "The Hogs"

The Hogs
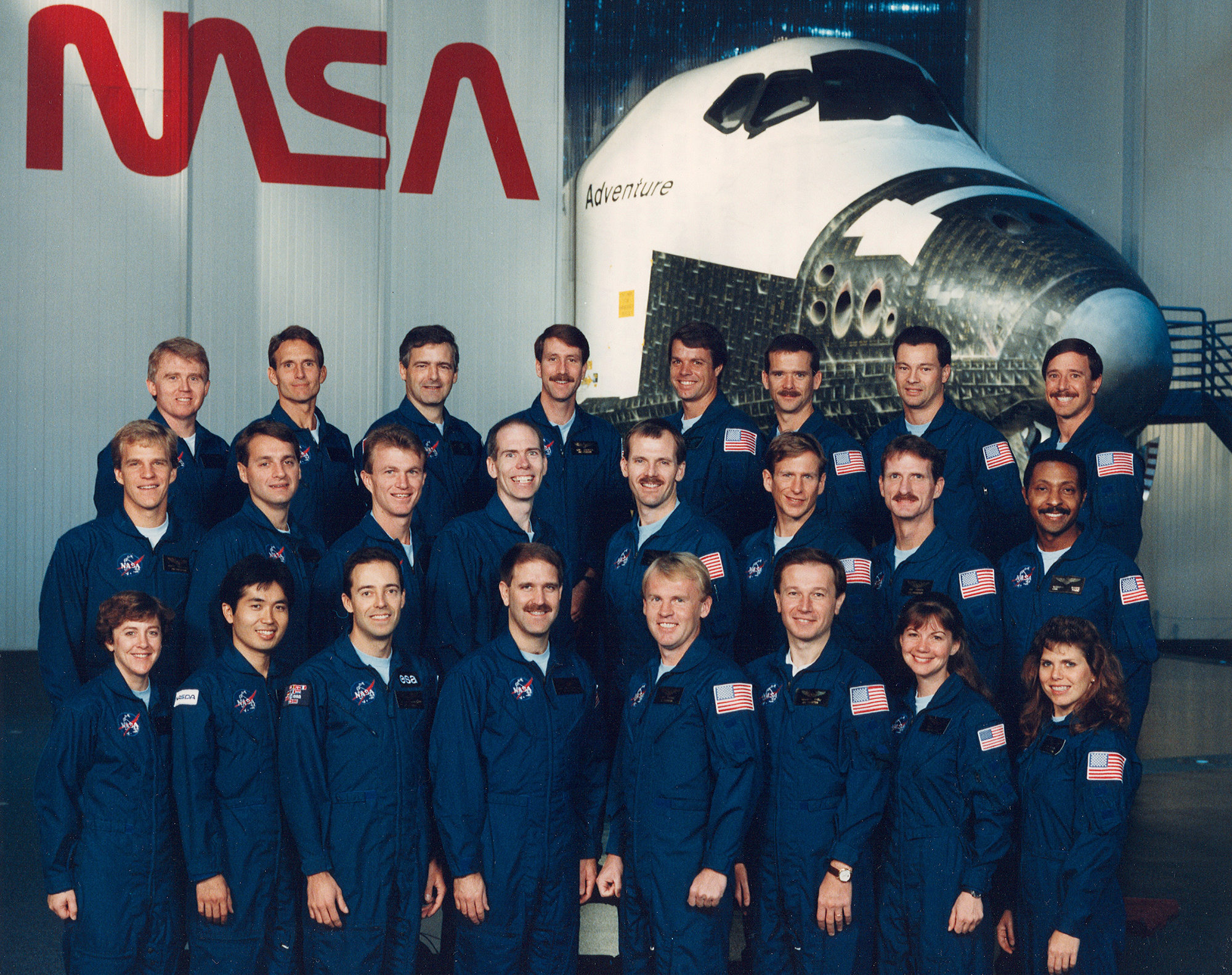
- The astronauts of Group 14
- Year selected: 1992
- Number selected: 24

NASA Astronaut Group 14 (nicknamed "The Hogs") was a group of 24 astronauts announced by NASA on 31 March 1992. The group's name derived from The Muppet Show skit "Pigs in Space" and from the group's sponsorship of a pot-bellied pig at the Houston Zoo.

== Pilots ==
- Scott J. Horowitz (born 1957), U.S. Air Force (4 flights)

STS-75 Columbia
STS-82 Discovery
STS-101 Atlantis
STS-105 Discovery

- Brent W. Jett Jr. (born 1958), U.S. Navy (4 flights)

STS-72 Endeavour
STS-81 Atlantis
STS-97 Endeavour
STS-115 Atlantis

- Kevin R. Kregel (born 1956), U.S. Air Force (4 flights)

STS-70 Discovery
STS-78 Columbia
STS-87 Columbia
STS-99 Endeavour

- Kent V. Rominger (born 1956), U.S. Navy (5 flights)

STS-73 Columbia
STS-80 Columbia
STS-85 Discovery
STS-96 Discovery
STS-100 Endeavour

== Mission Specialists ==
- Daniel T. Barry (born 1953), Scientist (3 flights)

STS-72 Endeavour
STS-96 Discovery
STS-105 Discovery

- Charles E. Brady Jr. (1951-2006), U.S. Navy (1 flight)

STS-78 Columbia

- Catherine Coleman (born 1960), U.S. Air Force (3 flights)

STS-73 Columbia
STS-93 Columbia
Soyuz TMA-20
Expedition 26/27

- Michael Gernhardt (born 1956), Bioengineer (4 flights)

STS-69 Endeavour
STS-83 Columbia
STS-94 Columbia
STS-104 Atlantis

- John Grunsfeld (born 1958), Physicist (5 flights)

STS-67 Endeavour
STS-81 Atlantis
STS-103 Discovery
STS-109 Columbia
STS-125 Atlantis

- Wendy B. Lawrence (born 1959), U.S. Navy (4 flights)

STS-67 Endeavour
STS-86 Atlantis
STS-91 Discovery
STS-114 Discovery

- Jerry Linenger (born 1955), U.S. Navy (2 flights)

STS-64 Discovery
STS-81 Atlantis (Launched to MIR)
STS-84 Atlantis (Returned from MIR)

- Richard Linnehan (born 1957), Veterinarian (4 flights)

STS-78 Columbia
STS-90 Columbia
STS-109 Columbia
STS-123 Endeavour

- Michael Lopez-Alegria (born 1958), U.S. Navy (6 flights)

STS-73 Columbia
STS-92 Discovery
STS-113 Endeavour
Soyuz TMA-9 (Launch vehicle for Expedition 14)
Expedition 14
Axiom Mission 1 (Private spaceflight to the ISS)
Axiom Mission 3 (Private spaceflight to the ISS)

- Scott Parazynski (born 1961), Physician (5 flights)

STS-66 Atlantis
STS-86 Atlantis
STS-95 Discovery
STS-100 Endeavour
STS-120 Discovery

- Winston Scott (born 1950), U.S. Navy (2 flights)

STS-72 Endeavour
STS-87 Columbia

- Steven Smith (born 1958), Engineer (4 flights)

STS-68 Endeavour
STS-82 Discovery
STS-103 Discovery
STS-110 Atlantis

- Joseph Tanner (born 1950), U.S. Navy (4 flights)

STS-66 Atlantis
STS-82 Discovery
STS-97 Endeavour
STS-115 Atlantis

- Andy Thomas (born 1951), Engineer (4 flights)

STS-77 Endeavour
STS-89 Endeavour (Launched to MIR)
STS-91 Discovery (Returned from MIR)
STS-102 Discovery
STS-114 Discovery

- Mary Weber (born 1962), Scientist (2 flights)

STS-70 Discovery
STS-101 Atlantis

== International Astronauts ==
- Marc Garneau (born 1949), Royal Canadian Navy (3 flights)

STS-41-G Challenger
STS-77 Endeavour
STS-97 Endeavour

- Chris Hadfield (born 1959), Royal Canadian Air Force (3 flights)

STS-74 Atlantis
STS-100 Endeavour
Soyuz TMA-07M (Launched to ISS)
Expedition 34 (Last part of expedition)
Expedition 35 (All of expedition)

- Maurizio Cheli (born 1959), Italian Air Force (1 flight)

STS-75 Columbia

- Jean-François Clervoy (born 1958), Engineer (3 flights)

STS-66 Atlantis
STS-84 Atlantis
STS-103 Discovery

- Koichi Wakata (born 1963), Engineer (5 flights)

STS-72 Endeavour
STS-92 Discovery
STS-119 Discovery/STS-127 Endeavour ISS Expedition 18/19/20
Soyuz TMA-11M ISS Expedition 38/39 (During Expedition 39 he became the first Japanese ISS commander)
SpaceX Crew-5 ISS Expedition 68

== See also ==
- List of astronauts by year of selection
