= Whinston =

Whinston is a surname. Notable people with the surname include:

- Andrew B. Whinston (born 1936), American economist and computer scientist
- Michael Whinston (born 1959), American economist

== See also ==
- Winston (disambiguation)
- Winston (name)
