= Brent W. Jett Jr. =

American astronaut, aviator and engineer (born 1958)

Brent Jett
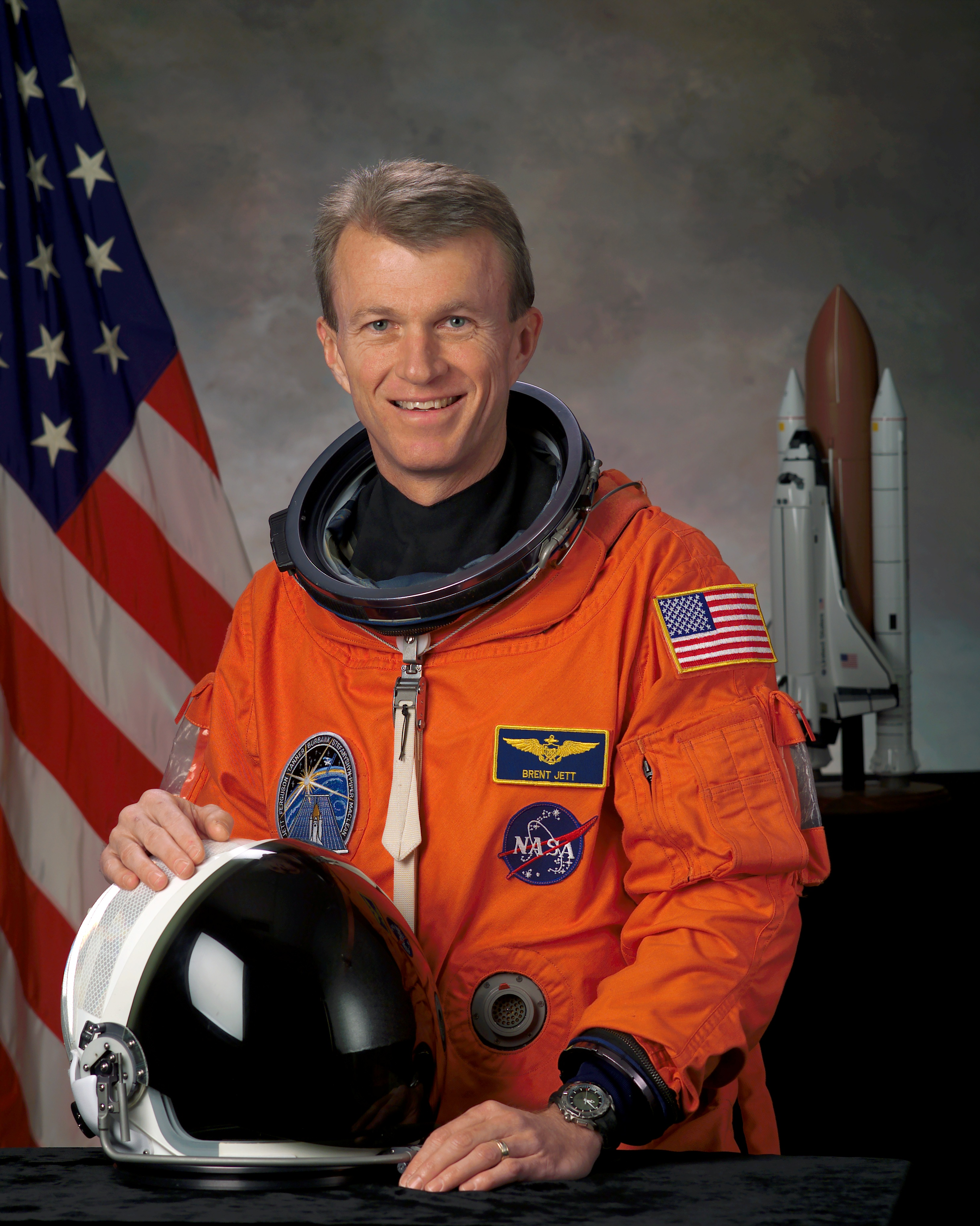
- Born: Brent Ward Jett Jr. October 5, 1958 (age 67); Pontiac, Michigan, U.S.
- Education: United States Naval Academy (BS); Naval Postgraduate School (MS)
- Awards: Distinguished Flying Cross
- Space career

NASA astronaut
- Rank: Captain, USN
- Time in space: 41d 18h 1m
- Selection: NASA Group 14 (1992)
- Missions: STS-72; STS-81; STS-97; STS-115
- Retired: January 2013

Brent Ward Jett Jr. (born October 5, 1958), (Capt, USN, Ret.), is a retired American naval officer and aviator, test pilot, aerospace and aeronautical engineer, and NASA astronaut.

== Personal life ==
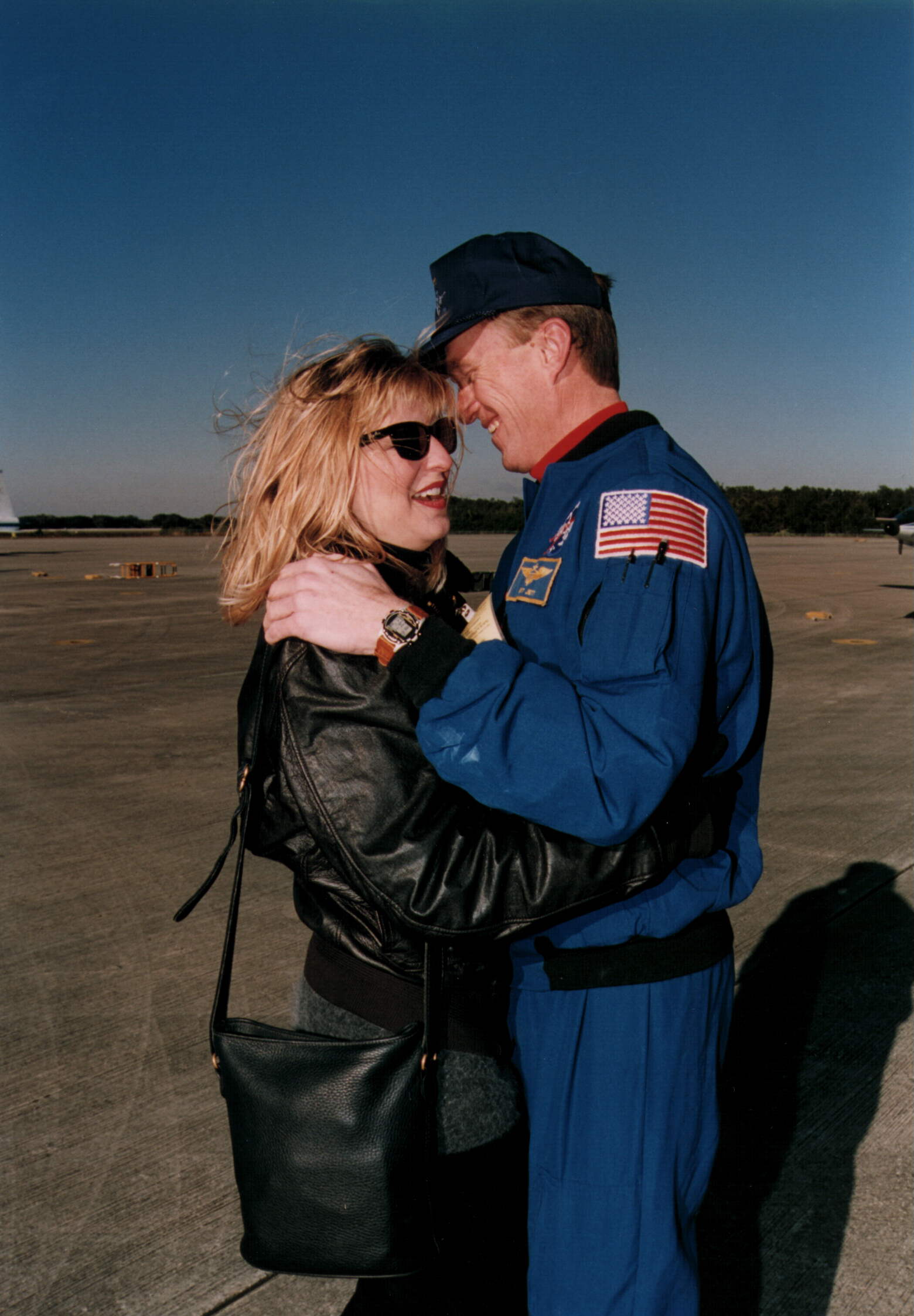
Jett and his wife before the launch of STS-72.

Jett was born in Pontiac, Michigan, but considers Fort Lauderdale, Florida, to be his hometown. Married to Connie Jett of Atlanta, Georgia. His hobbies are water and snow skiing, board sailing, boating, running, basketball, and squash.

== Education ==
He received a Bachelor of Science degree in aerospace engineering from the United States Naval Academy in 1981. He received a Master of Science degree in aeronautical engineering from the U.S. Naval Postgraduate School in 1989.

== Naval service ==
Jett was designated a Naval Aviator in March 1983, and reported to VF-101 at Naval Air Station Oceana, Virginia for initial F-14 Tomcat training. Upon completion of this training, he was assigned to VF-74 and made overseas deployments to the Mediterranean Sea and Indian Ocean aboard the aircraft carrier USS Saratoga. While assigned to VF-74, he was designated as an airwing qualified Landing Signal Officer (LSO) and also attended the Navy Fighter Weapons School (TOPGUN).

Jett was selected for the U.S. Naval Postgraduate School – Test Pilot School Cooperative Education Program in July 1986, and completed 15 months of graduate work at Monterey, California, before attending the U.S. Naval Test Pilot School in June 1989. After graduation in June 1990, he worked as a project test pilot at the Carrier Suitability Department of the Strike Aircraft Test Directorate, Naval Air Test Center, flying the F-14A/B/D, T-45A, and A-7E. Jett returned to the operational Navy in September 1991 and was again assigned to VF-74, flying the F-14B aboard USS Saratoga.

He has logged over 5,000 flight hours in more than 30 different aircraft and has over 450 carrier landings.

== NASA career ==
Selected by NASA in March 1992, Jett reported to the Johnson Space Center in August 1992. After two years of various technical assignments in the Astronaut Office, Jett was assigned to his first mission as the pilot of STS-72. A year later he again served as pilot on STS-81. From June 1997 to February 1998, he served as NASA Director of Operations at the Yuri Gagarin Cosmonaut Training Center, Star City, Russia. Two years later he was the commander on STS-97. Finally, he served as the commander of Space Shuttle Atlantis on STS-115. A veteran of four space missions, he has traveled over 12.1 million miles, and logged a total of 41 days, 18 hours, and 1 minute in space. Jett retired from the U.S. Navy in July 2007, but remained with NASA. In November 2007, he was appointed as Director of Flight Crew Operations. From November 2007 to February 2011, he was Director of Flight Crew Operations at JSC. From March 2010 to January 2013, Jett was the Deputy Manager for the NASA Commercial Crew Program. He retired from NASA in January 2013.

=== Spaceflight experience ===
==== STS-72 ====
Space Shuttle Endeavour, piloted by Jett, launched from Kennedy Space Center Launch Complex 39B, January 11, 1996, 09:41 UTC. During the 9-day mission the crew retrieved the Japanese Space Flyer Unit launched by NASDA March 18, 1995. The crew additionally deployed and retrieved the Office of Aeronautics and Space Technology Flyer (OAST-Flyer) and performed two EVAs with the purpose of preparing techniques for assembling the International Space Station. Endavour landed at the Shuttle Landing Facility 20 January 1996, 07:41 UTC.

==== STS-81 ====
Space Shuttle Atlantis, piloted by Jett, lifted off from Kennedy Space Center Launch Complex 39B January 12, 1997, 09:27 UTC The 10 day mission marked Jett's second space flight. The mission was the fifth in a series of joint missions between the U.S. Space Shuttle and the Russian Space Station Mir and the second one involving an exchange of U.S. astronauts. In five days of docked operations more than three tons of food, water, experiment equipment and samples were moved back and forth between the two spacecraft. Atlantis touched down at the Space Shuttle Landing Facility, January 22, 1997, 14:23 UTC.

==== STS-97 ====
Space Shuttle Endeavour launched from Kennedy Space Center Launch Complex 39B, 1 December 2000, 03:06 UTC STS-97 was Jett's third mission to space and first time in command. The primary objective of the mission was to deliver and install a 17 ton solar array to the International Space Station, in addition to batteries, radiators to provide cooling and a communications system for voice and telemetry. Assembly operations were conducted during 3 EVAs. Endeavour touched down at the Shuttle Landing Facility, 11 December 2000, 23:04 UTC

==== STS-115 ====
Jett's fourth and final space mission commenced as Space Shuttle Atlantis launched from Kennedy Space Center Launch Complex 39B, 9 September 2006, 15:15 UTC. STS-115 was the first assembly mission to the International Space Station after the Columbia disaster. The primary objective of the mission was to deliver and install the P3/P4 truss structure and solar array to the International Space Station during 3 EVAs. The mission concluded with the landing of Atlantis at the Shuttle Landing Facility, 21 September 2006, 10:21 UTC.

== Organizations ==
- Society of Experimental Test Pilots
- Association of Naval Aviation
- U.S. Naval Academy Alumni Association
- Association of Space Explorers

== Special honors ==
- Graduated first of 976 in the Class of 1981 at U.S. Naval Academy
- Distinguished Graduate U.S. Naval Test Pilot School Class 95
- Awarded the Distinguished Flying Cross
- Awarded the Defense Superior Service Medal and Defense Meritorious Service Medals
- Awarded the Navy Commendation Medal
- Awarded the NASA Exceptional Service Medal
- Awarded 4 NASA Space Flight Medals
- Awarded the various other service awards
- A portion of Northeast 56th Street in Jett's home city of Fort Lauderdale, Florida, has been designated "Brent Jett Boulevard" in his honor.
