= Bakboord =

Bakboord is a surname. Notable people with the surname include:

- Carla Bakboord (born 1959), Surinamese anthropologist, feminist and singer
- Navajo Bakboord (born 1999), Dutch footballer
- Winston Bakboord (born 1971), Dutch footballer
