= Pat Henry =

Pat Henry may refer to:

- Pat Henry (athletics coach) (born 1951), track & field coach at Texas A&M University
- Pat Henry (politician) (1861–1933), U.S. Representative from Mississippi
- Pat Henry (comedian) (1924–1982), American comedian
- Pat Henry, chairman of the Atlanta convention Dragon Con

== See also ==
- Patrick Henry (disambiguation)
