= Winston Manor =

Winston Manor may refer to:

- Winston Manor (Devon)
- Winston Manor (Isle of Wight)
- Winston Manor Hotel, Bristol
