= Winston =

Winston may refer to:

== People ==
- Winston (name), both a given name and surname; includes lists of notable people with the name

== Places ==
=== Antarctica ===
- Winston Glacier

=== Australia ===
- Winston, Queensland, a suburb of the City of Mount Isa
- Winston Hills, Sydney, New South Wales

=== United Kingdom ===
- Winston, County Durham, England, a village
- Winston, Suffolk, England, a village and civil parish

=== United States ===
- Winston, Florida, a former census-designated place
- Winston, Georgia, an unincorporated community
- Winston, Missouri, a village
- Winston, Montana, a census-designated place
- Winston, New Mexico, a census-designated place
- Winston, Oregon, a city
- Winston County, Alabama
- Winston County, Mississippi
- Winston-Salem, North Carolina, a city
- Winstonville, Mississippi, a town

== Buildings ==
- Winston Manor (disambiguation), several houses in England
- Winston Theatre, at the University of Bristol in England
- Winston Tower, a skyscraper in Winston-Salem, North Carolina

== Business ==
- Winston (cigarette), an American cigarette introduced in 1954
- Winston Broadcasting Network, a company that owns one television station in the midwestern United States

== Education ==
- Winston Preparatory School, New York City
- Winston School (Lakeland, Florida), on the National Register of Historic Places
- The Winston School, a private coeducational day school in Dallas, Texas

== Entertainment ==
- Winston (band), a Canadian indie pop band
- Winston Science Fiction, a line of young-adult titles from publisher John C. Winston Company
- John C. Winston Company, an American publishing company, later part of Holt Rinehart & Winston

== Racing ==
- The Winston, now known as the NASCAR Sprint All-Star Race
- Winston 500 (disambiguation), referring to two different NASCAR Sprint Cup races
- Winston Cup, the name of a NASCAR racing series between 1972 and 2003

== Transportation ==
- USS Winston, an Andromeda-class attack cargo ship of the United States Navy
- Winston (yacht), a racing yacht of the 1990s
- Winston Tunnel, a railroad tunnel in Illinois

== Other uses ==
- Cyclone Winston, a Category 5 tropical cyclone in the South Pacific in February 2016
- Republic of Winston, referring to resistance in Winston County, Alabama, to the Confederacy during the American Civil War
- Winston (apple), a variety of russet apple
- Winston (horse) a horse ridden by Queen Elizabeth II
- Winston (whale), an orca also known as Ramu III

== See also ==
- Winstone
