= Patrick Henry Middle School =

Patrick Henry Middle School may refer to:

- Patrick Henry Middle School (Los Angeles, California), Granada Hills, California, part of the Los Angeles Unified School District
- Patrick Henry Middle School, Woodhaven-Brownstown School District, Detroit, Michigan
- Patrick Henry Middle School, Sioux Falls School District, Sioux Falls, South Dakota

== See also ==
- Patrick Henry High School (disambiguation)
