= Winstone (surname) =

Winstone is a surname and occasional given name. Notable people with the name include:

- Alec Winstone (1879–1963), English cricketer
- Andrew Winstone (born 1975), English cricketer
- Dorothy Winstone (1919–2014), New Zealand educationalist and academic
- Edith Winstone Blackwell (née Winstone, 1877–1956), New Zealand philanthropist
- Eric Winstone (1913–1974), English band leader
- H. V. F. Winstone (1926–2010), English author and journalist
- Howard Winstone (1939–2000), Welsh boxer
- Jaime Winstone (born 1985), English actress
- James Winstone (1863–1921), British trade unionist
- Jane Winstone (1912–1944), New Zealand aviator
- Lincoln Arthur Winstone Efford (1907–1962), New Zealand pacifist
- Lois Winstone (born 1982), English actress
- Michael Winstone (born 1958), Canadian-born English sculptor
- Norma Winstone (born 1941), English jazz singer and lyricist
- Ray Winstone (born 1957), English actor
- Reece Winstone (1909–1991), English photographer
- Richard Winstone (1699–1787), English stage actor
- Simon Winstone (born 20th century), British author, screenwriter and script editor
- Simon Winstone (footballer) (born 1974), English footballer
- Winstone Zulu (1964–2011), Zambian HIV and TB activist

== See also ==
- Winston (name)
