= Winston Lee =

Jamaican-born American athlete (born 1994)

Profile
- Position: Defensive back

Personal information
- Born: August 2, 1994 (age 32); Portland, Jamaica
- Listed height: 6 ft 0 in (1.83 m)

Career information
- High school: Hudson High School (Hudson, NY)
- College: SUNY Cobleskill (2013–2015); Syracuse (2016–2017)

Winston A. Lee (born August 2, 1994) is a Jamaican-born American former collegiate athlete who competed in both track and field and American football. Lee won the NCAA Division III national title in the 60-meter dash for SUNY Cobleskill in 2015 and later joined the Syracuse Orange football team as a walk-on defensive back.

== Early life and education ==
Lee was born in Portland, Jamaica, and moved to the United States during his youth. He attended Hudson High School in Hudson, New York, where he competed in both football and sprinting. As a senior, he was listed in Bleacher Report's "Players to Watch" for the 2013 Blue-Grey All-Star Classic, which featured top high school prospects nationwide.

== Collegiate career ==
=== SUNY Cobleskill ===
Lee began his collegiate career at SUNY Cobleskill, competing in track and field from 2013 to 2015. In March 2015, he won the NCAA Division III national championship in the 60-meter dash with a time of 6.73 seconds, becoming the first Cobleskill athlete to capture an NCAA individual title. He also captured the Eastern College Athletic Conference (ECAC) Division III title, setting a meet and Armory facility record of 6.76 seconds. Lee later recorded a personal best of 6.68 seconds in the 60-meter dash in 2017, according to his World Athletics profile.

=== Syracuse University ===
In 2016, Lee transferred to Syracuse University and joined the Syracuse Orange football team as a walk-on defensive back. His transition from a national champion sprinter to a football player was profiled by The Daily Orange, which detailed his determination and athletic background.

A feature by Nunes Magician called his addition to the roster “one of the most remarkable walk-on stories of the season.” He appeared on the official roster as a defensive back during the 2016 and 2017 seasons.

In 2017, Bleacher Report ranked Lee among the fastest players in college football, citing his 6.68-second indoor 60-meter time.

== Achievements ==
- NCAA Division III national champion – 60 m dash (2015)
- ECAC Division III record holder – 60 m dash (2015)
- Walk-on defensive back, Syracuse University football (2016–2017)
- Ranked among fastest players in college football by Bleacher Report (2017)

== Post-collegiate career ==
Following his college career, Lee founded Zeiko Coffee, a lifestyle brand that has partnered with collegiate athletics collectives such as Orange United and the South Main Collective, organizations supporting student-athletes through name, image, and likeness (NIL) initiatives.
