= Space Flyer Unit =

Japanese spacecraft

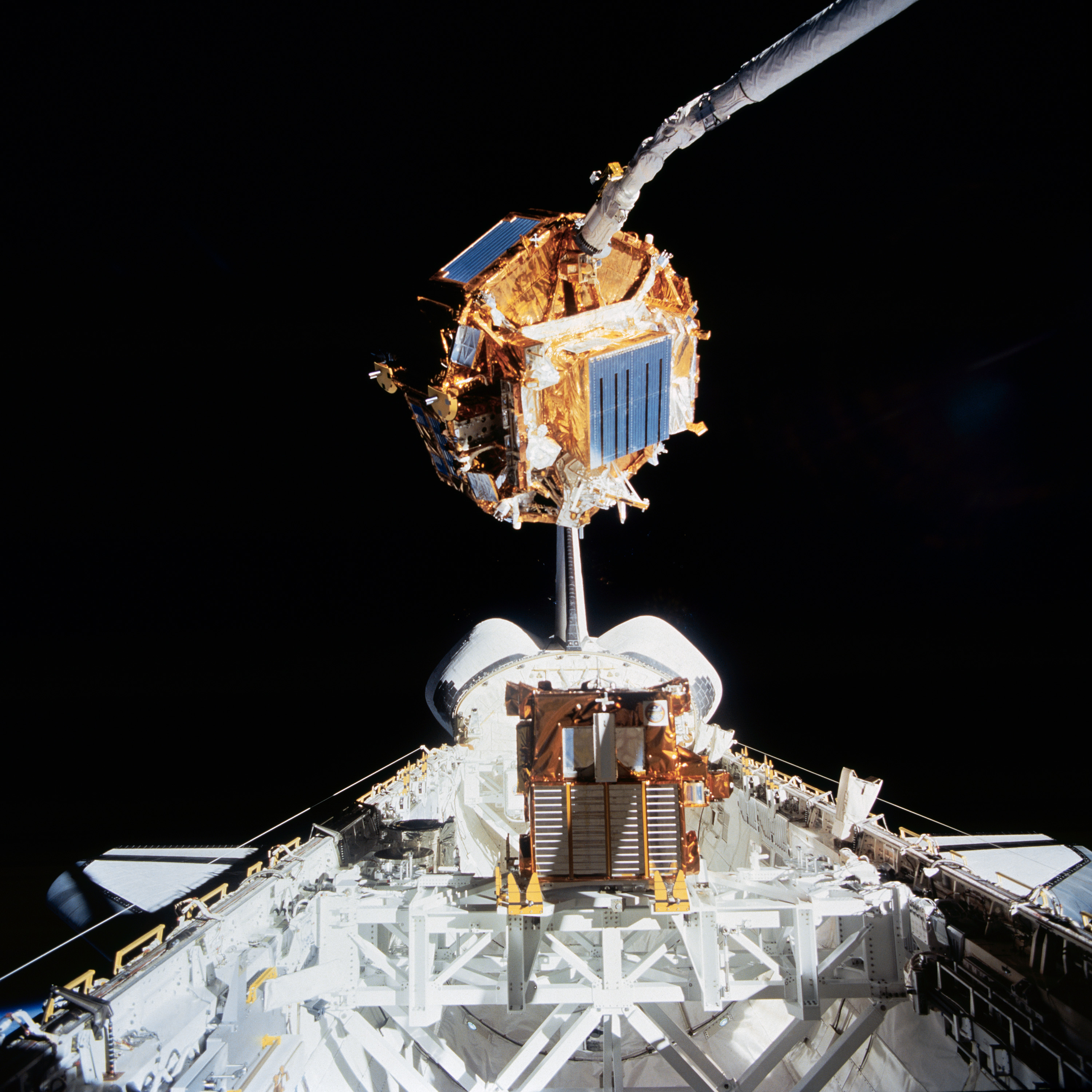
- Space Flyer Unit photographed from Endeavour during STS-72 mission
- Mission type: Technology
- Operator: NASDA; ISAS; NEDO; USEF
- COSPAR ID: 1995-011A
- SATCAT no.: 23521
- Website: www.isas.jaxa.jp/e/enterp/missions/sfu.shtml
- Mission duration: 10 months

Spacecraft properties
- Manufacturer: Mitsubishi Electric
- Launch mass: 3,846 kilograms (8,479 lb)
- Landing mass: 3,492 kilograms (7,699 lb)

Start of mission
- Launch date: 18 March 1995, 08:01 UTC
- Rocket: H-II 3F
- Launch site: Tanegashima Yoshinobu 1

End of mission
- Recovered by: Space Shuttle Endeavour; STS-72
- Recovery date: 13 January 1996
- Landing date: 20 January 1996, 07:41:41 UTC
- Landing site: Kennedy SLF Runway 15

Orbital parameters
- Reference system: Geocentric
- Regime: Low Earth
- Perigee altitude: 470 kilometres (290 mi)
- Apogee altitude: 492 kilometres (306 mi)
- Inclination: 28.4 degrees
- Period: 94.22 minutes
- Epoch: 17 April 1995

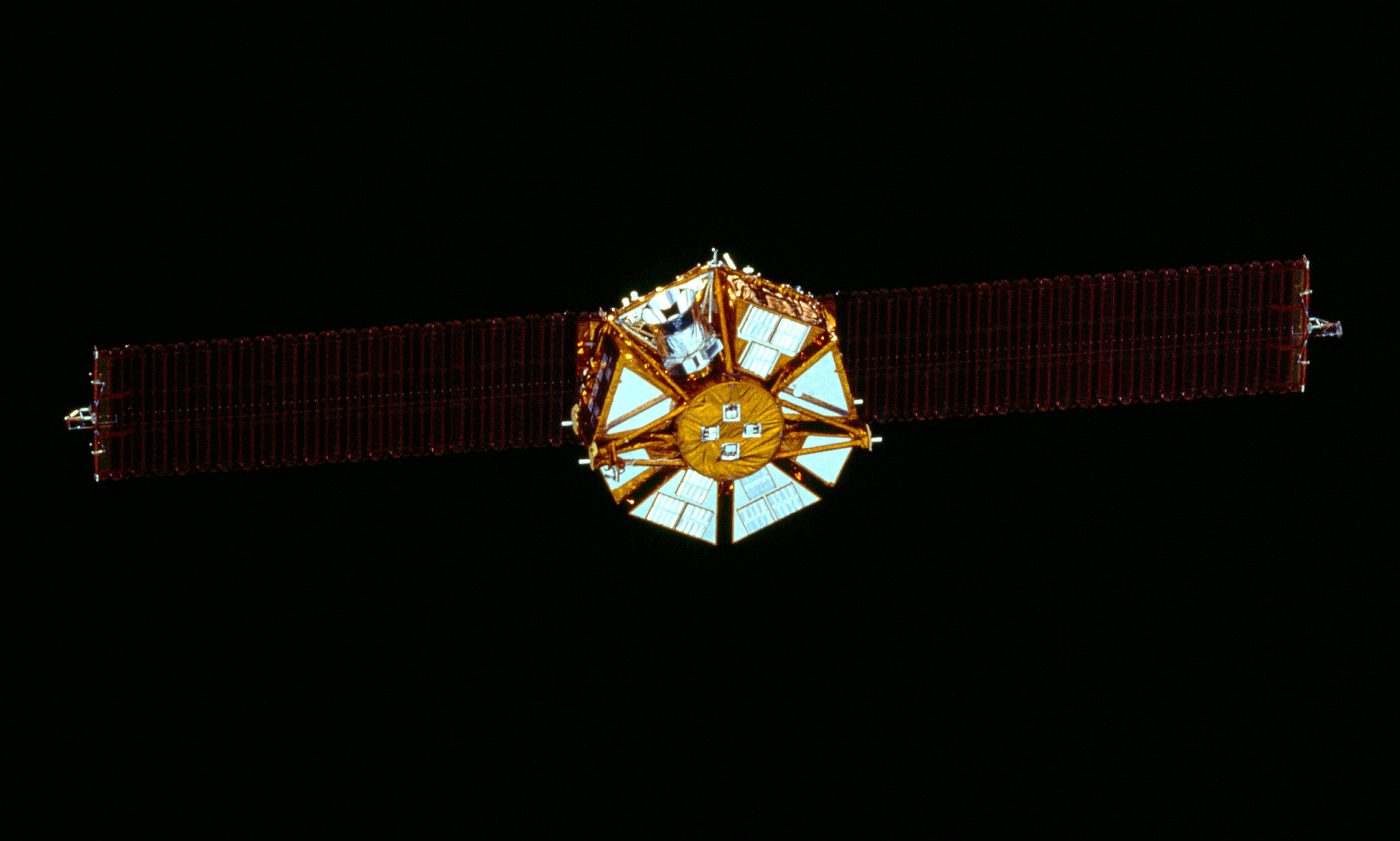
Space Flyer Unit

The Space Flyer Unit (宇宙実験・観測フリーフライヤ, Uchū Jikken-Kansoku Free Flyer) was a spacecraft which was launched by Japan on March 18, 1995.

== Technical data ==
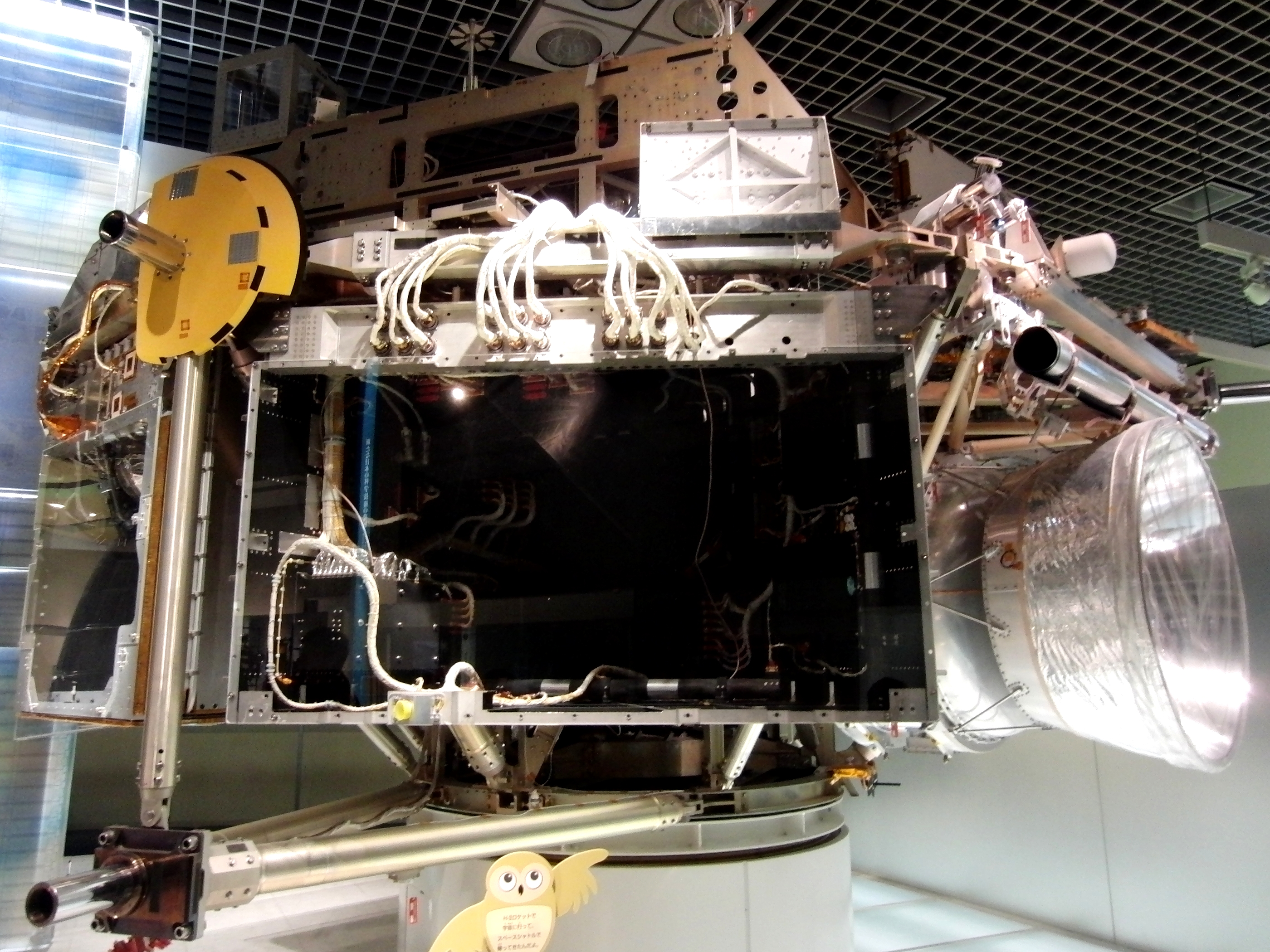
SFU exhibited in the National Museum of Nature and Science, Tokyo.

The Space Flyer Unit was launched from Tanegashima Space Center in an H-II vehicle. It carried testing materials and research data that held value to NASA. The crew of STS-72 aboard Space Shuttle Endeavour retrieved the satellite on January 20, 1996, 10 months after it was launched. The idea behind the implementation of the SFU was a joint effort by multiple major corporations and government agencies. The ones that were involved with the launch were the Institute of Space and Astronautical Science, the National Space Development Agency, and the Ministry of International Trade and Industry.

After the shuttle returned the SFU from space it was transported to Japan and refurbished for display at the National Museum of Nature and Science in Tokyo.

== Purpose ==
The original purposes behind the SFU was to

- Allow researchers better access to space research conditions.
- Give researchers a group experimental facility.
- Be able to reuse the SFU to save money
- Retrieve data

== Technology ==
A variety of systems that were operational within the SFU had never been implemented before. Equipment on board supported an infrared telescope, two-dimensional solar array, high voltage solar array, space plasma diagnosis, electric propulsion, material experimentation, gas dynamics, gradient heating chemicals, isothermal heating furnace and more. The core system that was built into the SFU contained an octagonal aluminum truss. Inside of that were eight boxes of trapezoidal shape. The SFU was connected directly to the Kagoshima Space Center.

== Experimentation data ==
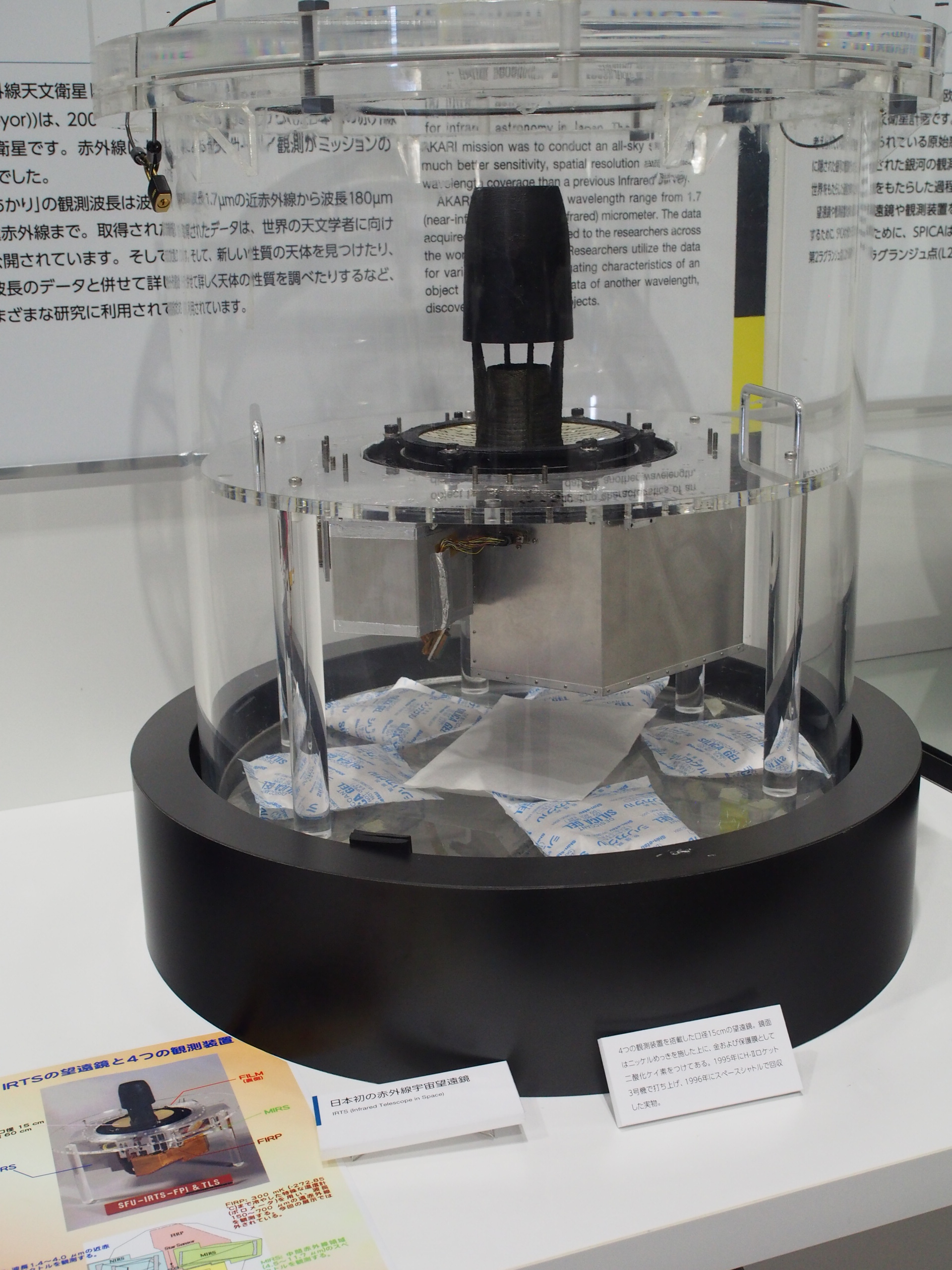
IRTS exhibited in the JAXA Sagamihara Campus Space Science Exploration Exchange Building

A number of various types of experiments that performed on board the SFU during its launch life cycle. Those experiments, and light data related to them are listed below.

- Infrared Telescope in Space (IRTS) - The IRTS experiment was performed by the infrared telescope that was aboard the SFU. The intent was to produce important information into the history of the universe and structure of the milky way galaxy. The telescope had a super fluid helium cooling fan built into it to prevent it from overheating.
- 2D Array - The 2d array system was launched as a small module inside of the SFU. This experiment was deployed to show that large structures could (in fact) be built in space.
- HVSA - The Solar Array was a power source put into this system to head up multiple experiments. It is used to test the creation of "electricity" in the denseness of space from the use of technology only.
- SPDP - This was used on the SFU to test things going really fast in space. SPDP stands for (Space Plasma Diagnostic Package) and it was deployed with different sensors to check the effects of speed on the denseness of gravity.
- EPEX - This hardware that was built into the SFU was meant to do experiments related to fuel creation and management in space.
- MEX - This software was meant to review and research the effects of various types of liquid within a space environment.
- BIO - This test involved observing Japanese fire belly newt eggs hatch in deep space.

== See also ==
- List of largest infrared telescopes
- European Retrievable Carrier – comparable spacecraft built by ESA, flown 1992–1993
- Long Duration Exposure Facility – NASA 1984–1990
