= STS-72 =

1996 American crewed spaceflight to retrieve the Space Flyer Unit

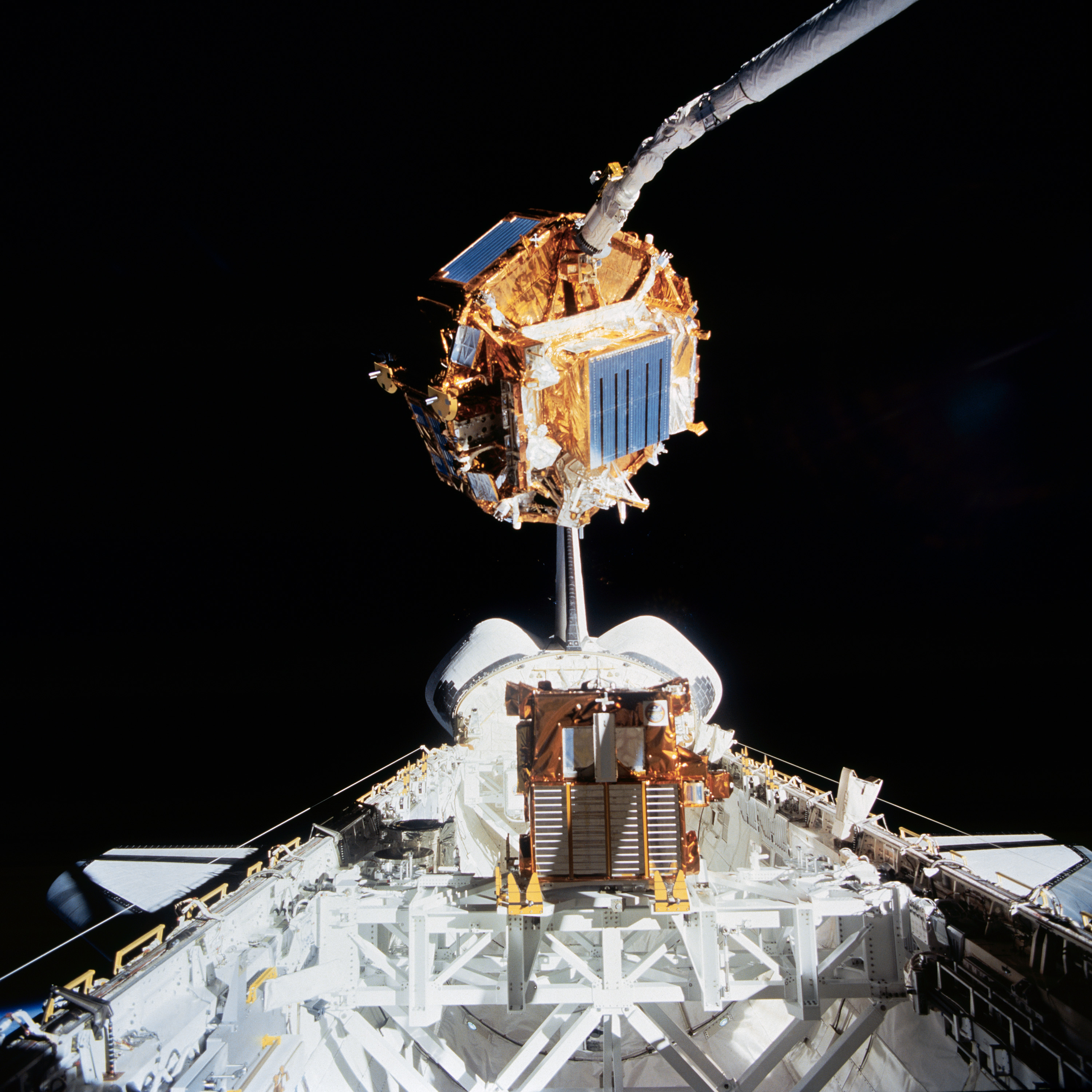
- Endeavour's Canadarm captures the Space Flyer Unit
- Mission type: Satellite retrieval Research
- Operator: NASA
- COSPAR ID: 1996-001A
- SATCAT no.: 23762
- Mission duration: 8 days, 22 hours, 01 minute, 47 seconds
- Distance travelled: 6,000,000 kilometres (3,700,000 mi)
- Orbits completed: 142

Spacecraft properties
- Spacecraft: Space Shuttle Endeavour
- Launch mass: 112,182 kilograms (247,319 lb)
- Landing mass: 98,549 kilograms (217,263 lb)
- Payload mass: 6,510 kilograms (14,350 lb)

Crew
- Crew size: 6
- Members: Brian Duffy; Brent W. Jett Jr.; Leroy Chiao; Winston E. Scott; Koichi Wakata; Daniel T. Barry

Start of mission
- Launch date: 11 January 1996, 09:41:00.072 UTC
- Launch site: Kennedy, LC-39B

End of mission
- Landing date: 20 January 1996, 07:41:41 UTC
- Landing site: Kennedy, SLF Runway 15

Orbital parameters
- Reference system: Geocentric
- Regime: Low Earth
- Perigee altitude: 185 kilometres (115 mi)
- Apogee altitude: 470 kilometres (290 mi)
- Inclination: 28.45 degrees
- Period: 91.1 min
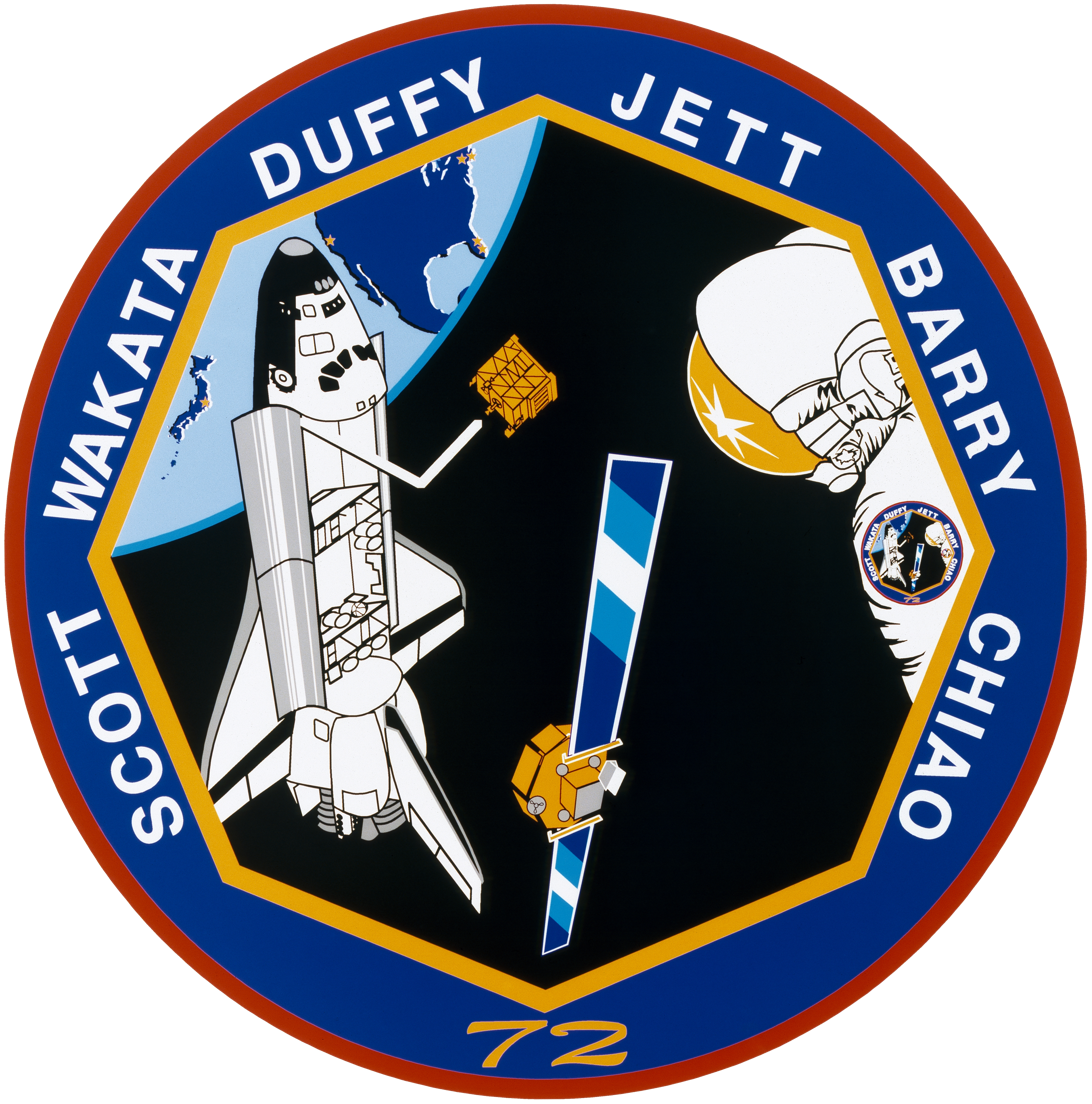
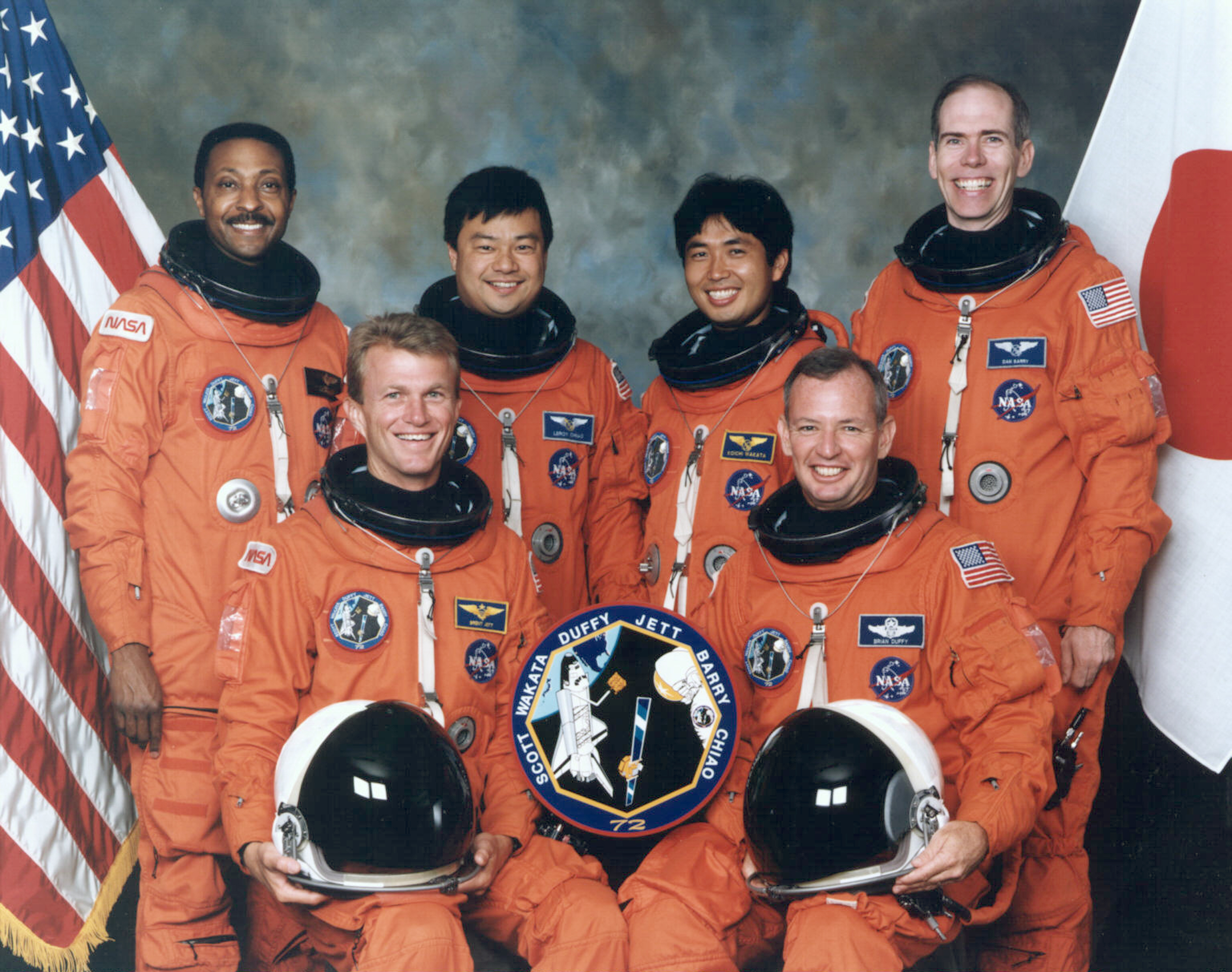
- Left to right - Seated: Jett, Duffy; Standing: Scott, Chiao, Wakata, Barry Space Shuttle program

STS-72 was a Space Shuttle Endeavour mission to capture and return to Earth a Japanese microgravity research spacecraft known as Space Flyer Unit (SFU). The mission launched from Kennedy Space Center, Florida on 11 January 1996.

== Crew ==
Position	Astronaut
Commander	(United States) Brian Duffy; Third spaceflight
Pilot	(United States) Brent W. Jett; First spaceflight
Mission Specialist 1	(United States) Leroy Chiao; Second spaceflight
Mission Specialist 2 Flight Engineer	(United States) Winston E. Scott; First spaceflight
Mission Specialist 3	(Japan) Koichi Wakata, JAXA; First spaceflight
Mission Specialist 4	(United States) Daniel T. Barry; First spaceflight

=== Crew seat assignments ===
Seat	Launch	Landing	Seats 1–4 are on the flight deck. Seats 5–7 are on the mid-deck.
1	Duffy		Seats 1–4 are on the flight deck. Seats 5–7 are on the mid-deck.
2	Jett		Seats 1–4 are on the flight deck. Seats 5–7 are on the mid-deck.
3	Chiao	Wakata	Seats 1–4 are on the flight deck. Seats 5–7 are on the mid-deck.
4	Scott		Seats 1–4 are on the flight deck. Seats 5–7 are on the mid-deck.
5	Wakata	Chiao	Seats 1–4 are on the flight deck. Seats 5–7 are on the mid-deck.
6	Barry		Seats 1–4 are on the flight deck. Seats 5–7 are on the mid-deck.
7	Unused		Seats 1–4 are on the flight deck. Seats 5–7 are on the mid-deck.

=== Spacewalks ===
- Chiao and Barry – EVA 1
- EVA 1 Start: 15 January 1996 – 05:35 UTC
- EVA 1 End: 15 January – 11:44 UTC
- Duration: 6 hours, 9 minutes
- Chiao and Scott – EVA 2
- EVA 2 Start: 17 January 1996 – 05:40 UTC
- EVA 2 End: 17 January – 12:34 UTC
- Duration: 6 hours, 54 minutes

== Mission highlights ==
STS-72, the 74th flight of the Space Shuttle program and the 10th of the orbiter Endeavour was launched at 4:41AM EST 11 January 1996 after a brief hold at the T−5-minute mark due to communication issues. The nighttime launch window was in support of the mission's primary objective, the capture and return to Earth of a Japanese microgravity research spacecraft known as Space Flyer Unit (SFU). The 3,577 kilograms (7,886 lb) SFU was launched by Japan's National Space Development Agency (NASDA) from Tanegashima Space Center in Japan on 18 March 1995 aboard a Japanese H-II rocket (HII-3), and spent ten months in orbit conducting automated research in materials science, biology, engineering, and astronomy. Mission Specialist Koichi Wakata operated the orbiter's remote manipulator system arm on flight day three to pluck SFU from orbit. Both of the satellite's solar arrays had to be jettisoned prior to retrieval when sensors indicated improper latching following their retraction. This jettison procedure had been incorporated in preflight training as a contingency in the event of such an occurrence. The canisters housing the arrays were jettisoned 12 minutes apart as Endeavour and the SFU traveled across Africa on the thirtieth orbit of the mission. The contingency procedure delayed the capture of the satellite by about an hour and half. Once in Endeavour's payload bay, the satellite's internal batteries were bypassed following connection of a remotely operated electrical cable to the side of the satellite. On this mission, Daniel T. Barry and Japanese astronaut Koichi Wakata were the first people to play Go in space; for this achievement, both Barry and Wakata received the honorary awards of Ni Dan rank by the Nihon Ki-in making Barry one of only four Western Go players to receive such an award. Barry and Wakata used a special Go set, which was named Go Space, designed by Wai-Cheung Willson Chow.

== OAST-Flyer ==
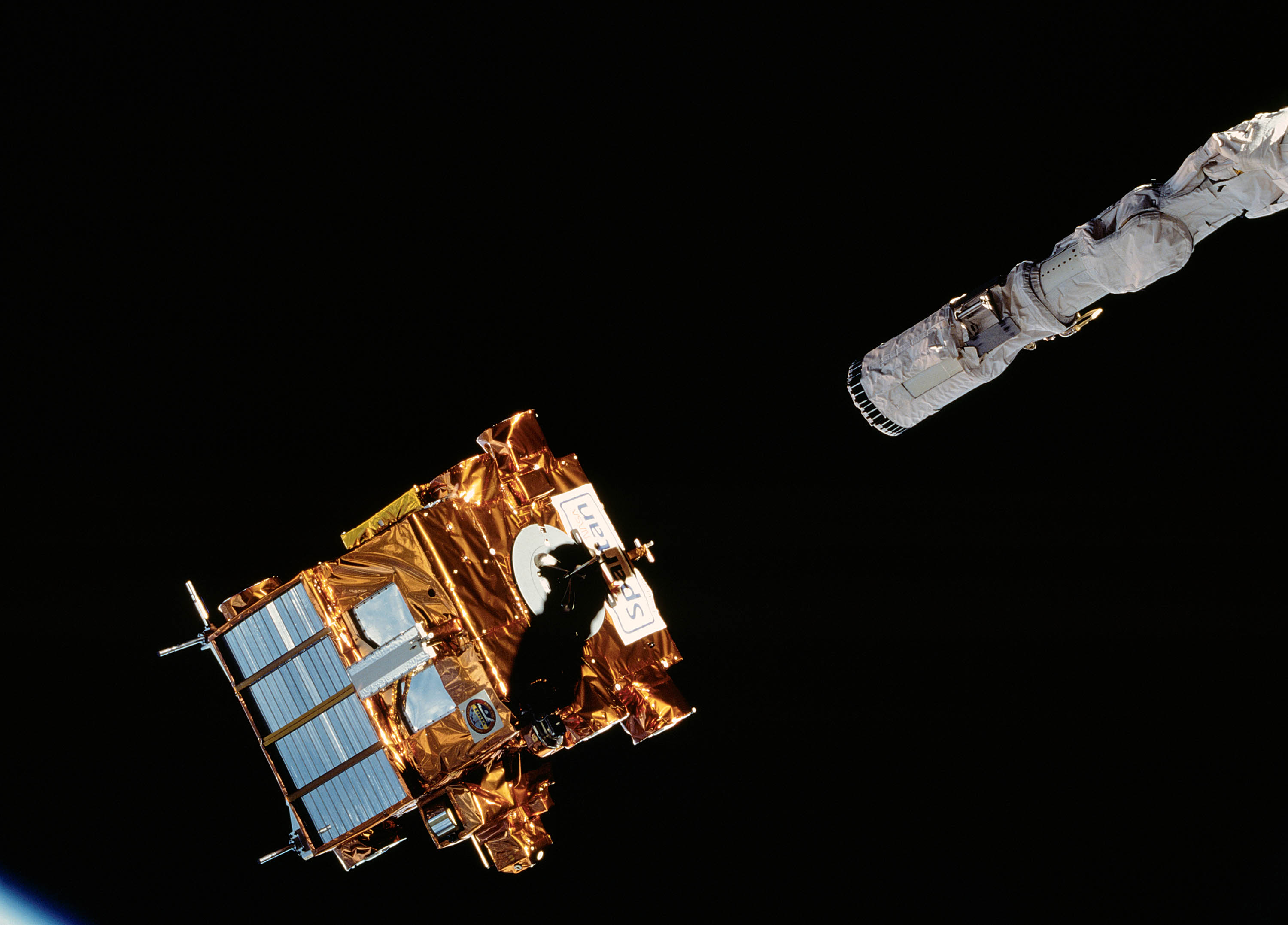
OAST-Flyer released.

The STS-72 mission also flew with the Office of Aeronautics and Space Technology Flyer (OAST-Flyer) spacecraft. OAST-Flyer was the seventh in a series of missions aboard the reusable free-flying Spartan carrier spacecraft series. It consisted of four experiments: Return Flux Experiment (REFLEX) to test accuracy of computer models predicting spacecraft exposure to contamination; Global Positioning System Attitude Determination and Control Experiment (GADACS) to demonstrate GPS technology in space; Solar Exposure to Laser Ordnance Device (SELODE) to test laser ordnance devices; Spartan Packet Radio Experiment (SPRE) and the Amateur Radio Association at the University of Maryland (W3EAX) amateur radio communications experiment. On flight day four, Wakata again operated Endeavour's robot arm to deploy the Spartan, sending the experiment-laden platform on its way to a 50-hour free-flight at a distance of approximately 45 miles (72 kilometers) from the orbiter. OAST-Flyer was retrieved on flight day six, with Wakata again operating the remote manipulator system arm to retrieve the platform.

== Spacewalks ==
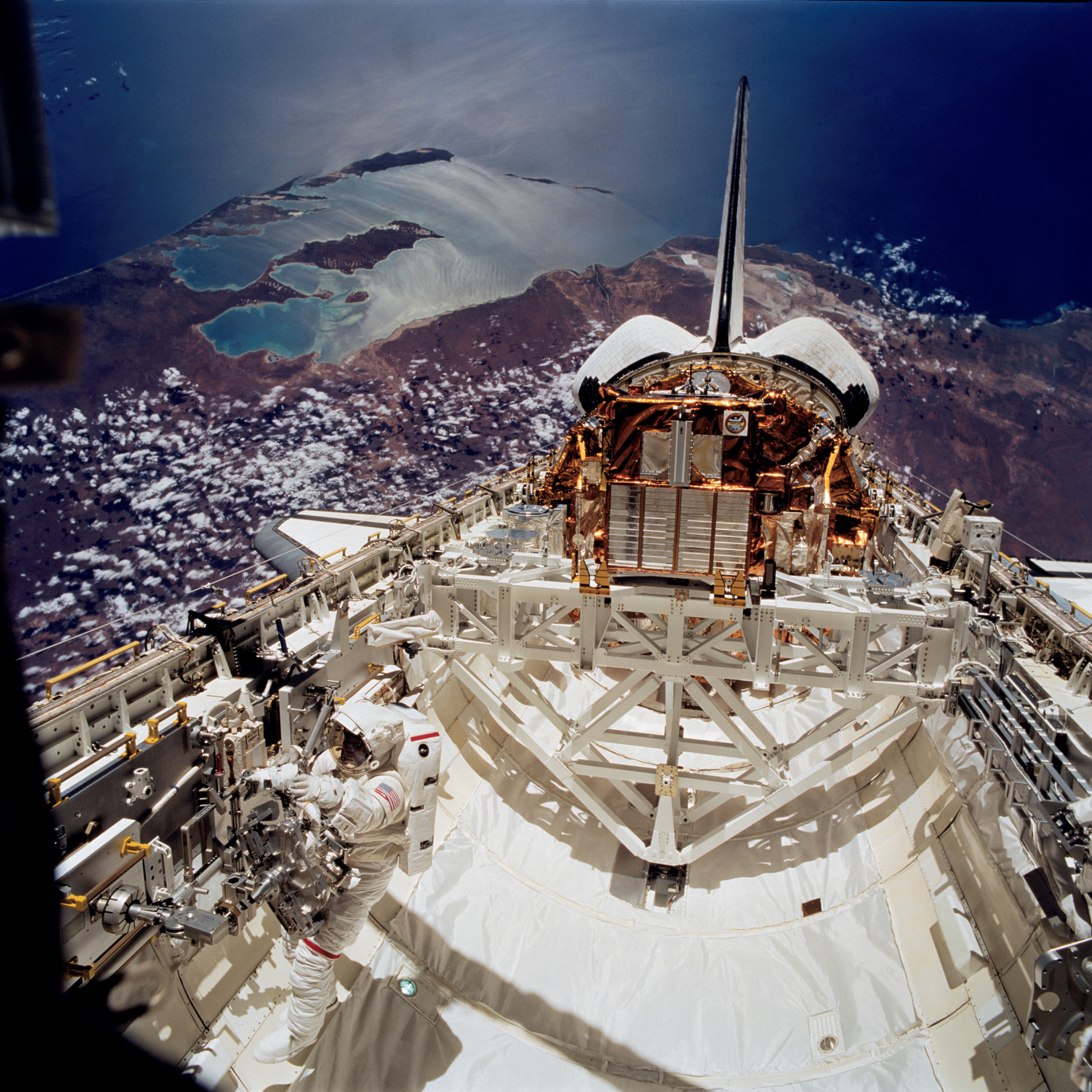
Leroy Chiao works in the payload bay.

Two 6.5-hour spacewalks were conducted by three astronauts to test hardware and tools to be used in the assembly of the International Space Station starting in late 1998. EVA-1 on flight day five consisted of Crewmembers Leroy Chiao (EV1) and Dan Barry (EV2). After taking a few minutes to acclimate themselves in the payload bay, first-time spacewalkers Chiao and Barry attached a portable work platform to the end of the robot arm, operated by Pilot Brent Jett and Mission Specialist Koichi Wakata. Jett used the arm to grapple various pieces of hardware designed to hold large modular components, mimicking the way equipment boxes and avionics gear will be moved back and forth in assembling the Space Station.

Chiao and Barry then unfolded a cable tray diagonally across the forward portion of the cargo bay housing simulated electrical and fluid lines similar to those which would later connect modules and nodes of the Space Station. The rigid umbilical, as it is known, was tested for its ease of handling and the ability of the astronauts to hook up the lines to connectors on the side of Endeavour's bay. While Chiao unraveled various lengths of cable from a caddy device, Barry spent time practicing the hookup of the various cables in the rigid umbilical to connectors in the bay, testing his ability to manipulate tiny bolts and screws in weightlessness. He reported that most tasks could be accomplished with little difficulty. Barry and Chiao then traded places, as Barry mounted the portable work platform to evaluate its worth. The first EVA lasted 6 hours, 9 minutes. EVA-2 on Flight Day 7 consisted of Leroy Chiao (EV1) and Winston Scott (EV2), lasting 6 hours, 53 minutes. Chiao and Scott worked with utility boxes, slidewires and a portable work stanchion affixed to Endeavour's robot arm to gather additional data on methods and procedures which would be incorporated in the techniques used to assemble the International Space Station. Late in the spacewalk, Scott climbed into foot restraints on the OAST-Flyer satellite platform for a thermal evaluation exercise. Endeavour was maneuvered to the coldest position possible, with its payload bay facing out toward deep space and allowing temperatures to dip to about 104 degrees below zero at the point where Scott was positioned to test the ability of his spacesuit to repel the bitter cold temperature of space.

== Additional payloads ==
Other experiments onboard STS-72 included the Shuttle Solar Backscatter Ultraviolet Experiment (SSBUV-8) (previously flown on STS-34, STS-41, STS-43, STS-45, STS-56, STS-62 and STS-66), EDFT-03, Shuttle Laser Altimeter Payload (SLA-01/GAS(5)), VDA-2, National Institutes of Health NIH-R3 Experiment, Space Tissue Loss Experiment (STL/NIH-C), Pool Boiling Experiment (PBE) (hardware previously flown on STS-47, STS-57 and STS-60) and the Thermal Energy Storage (TES-2) experiment (previously flown on STS-69). Get Away Special payloads included the United States Air Force Academy G-342 Flexible Beam Experiment (FLEXBEAM-2), Society of Japanese Aerospace Companies' G-459 – Protein Crystal Growth Experiment and the Jet Propulsion Laboratory GAS Ballast Can with Sample Return Experiment.

== Documentary ==
The crew of STS-72 and their families were followed by a camera crew from PBS from the day they were assigned to the flight and then through their training and, finally, the mission itself. The result was a 90-minute documentary narrated by Bill Nye titled Astronauts which first aired on PBS on 17 July 1997 and was later released on VHS home video.

In December 2020, photographer John Angerson released unseen photos of mission preparation.

== Image Gallery ==
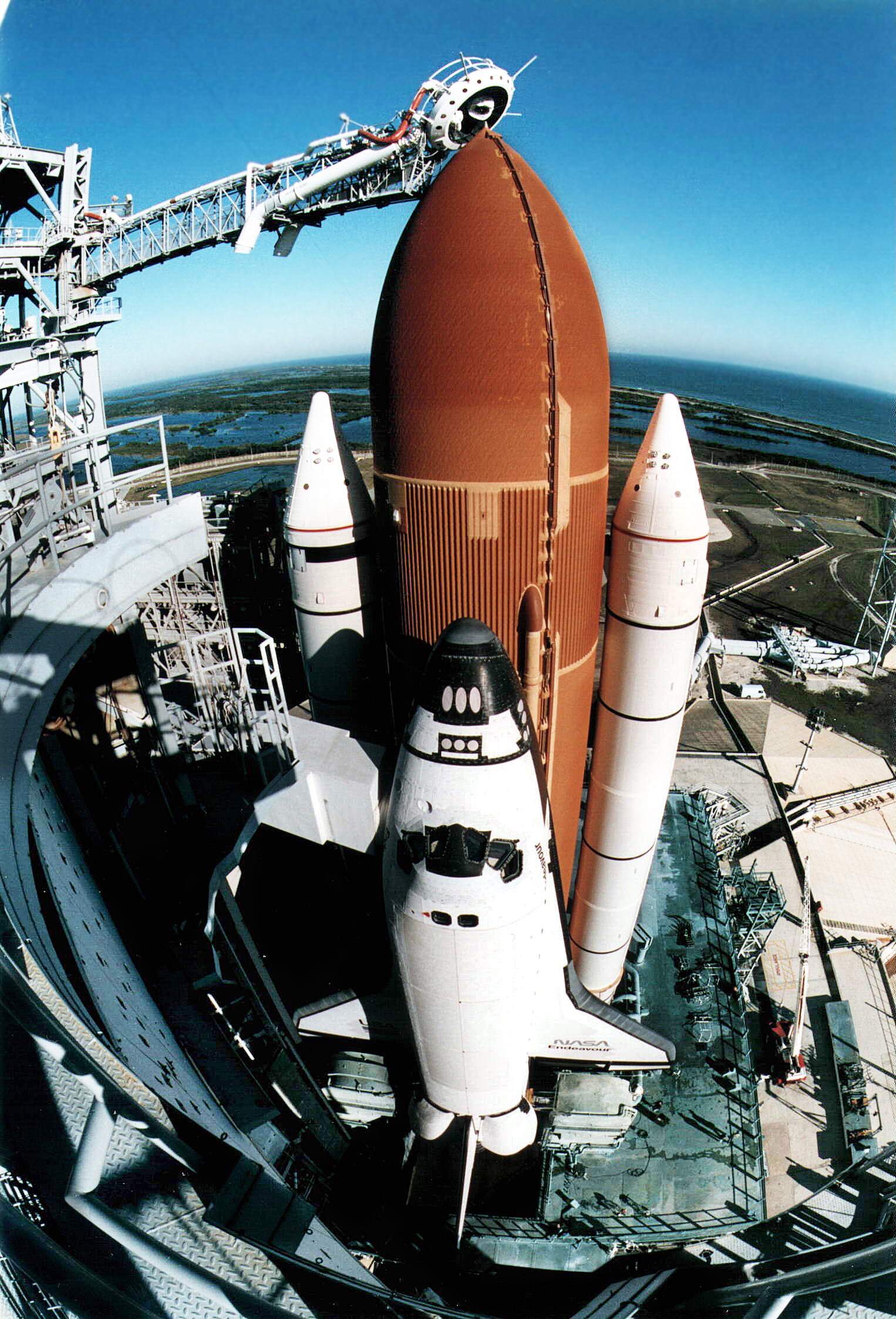
Endeavour on Pad 39B.

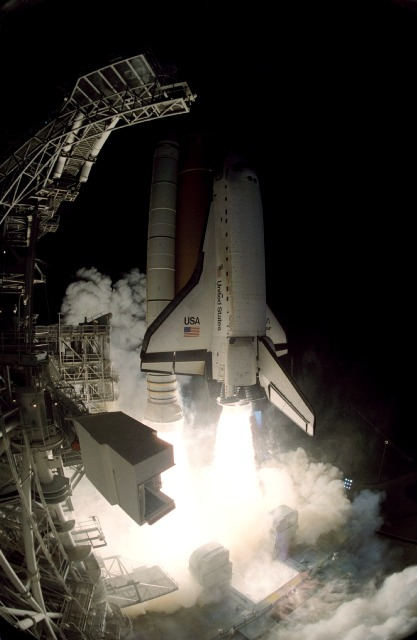
Endeavour launching on STS-72.

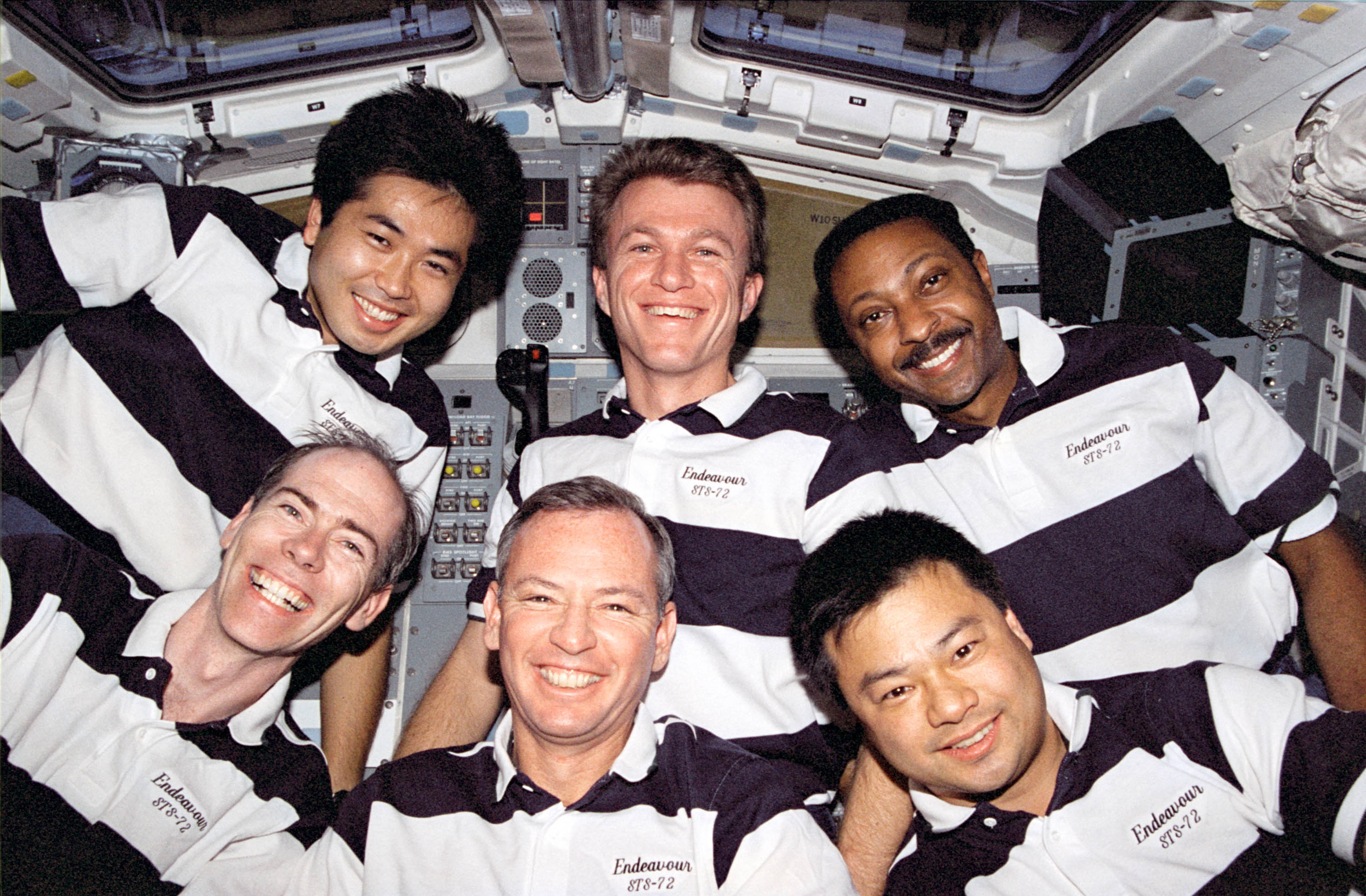
Traditional inflight crew portrait.

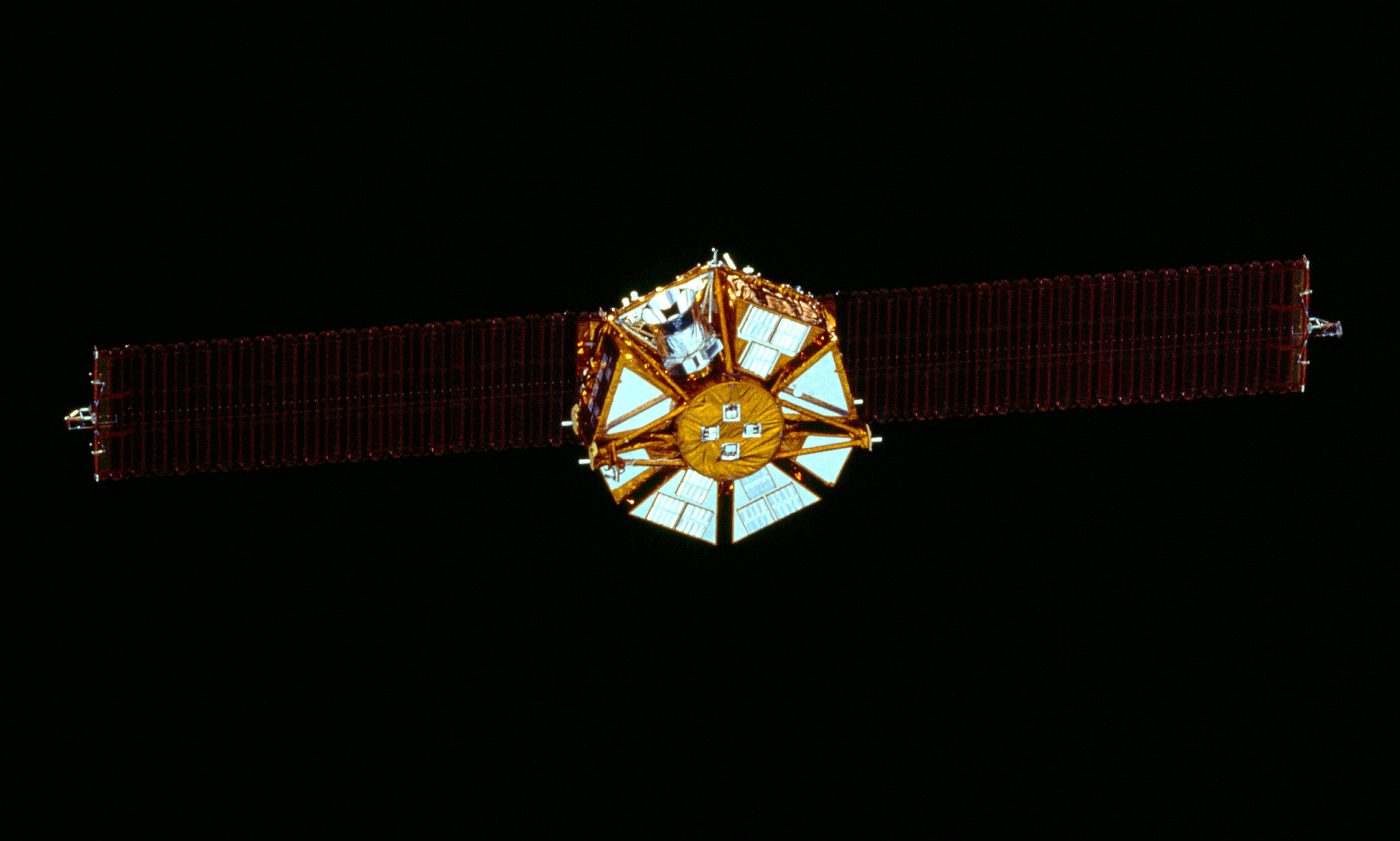
Space Flyer Unit on approach.

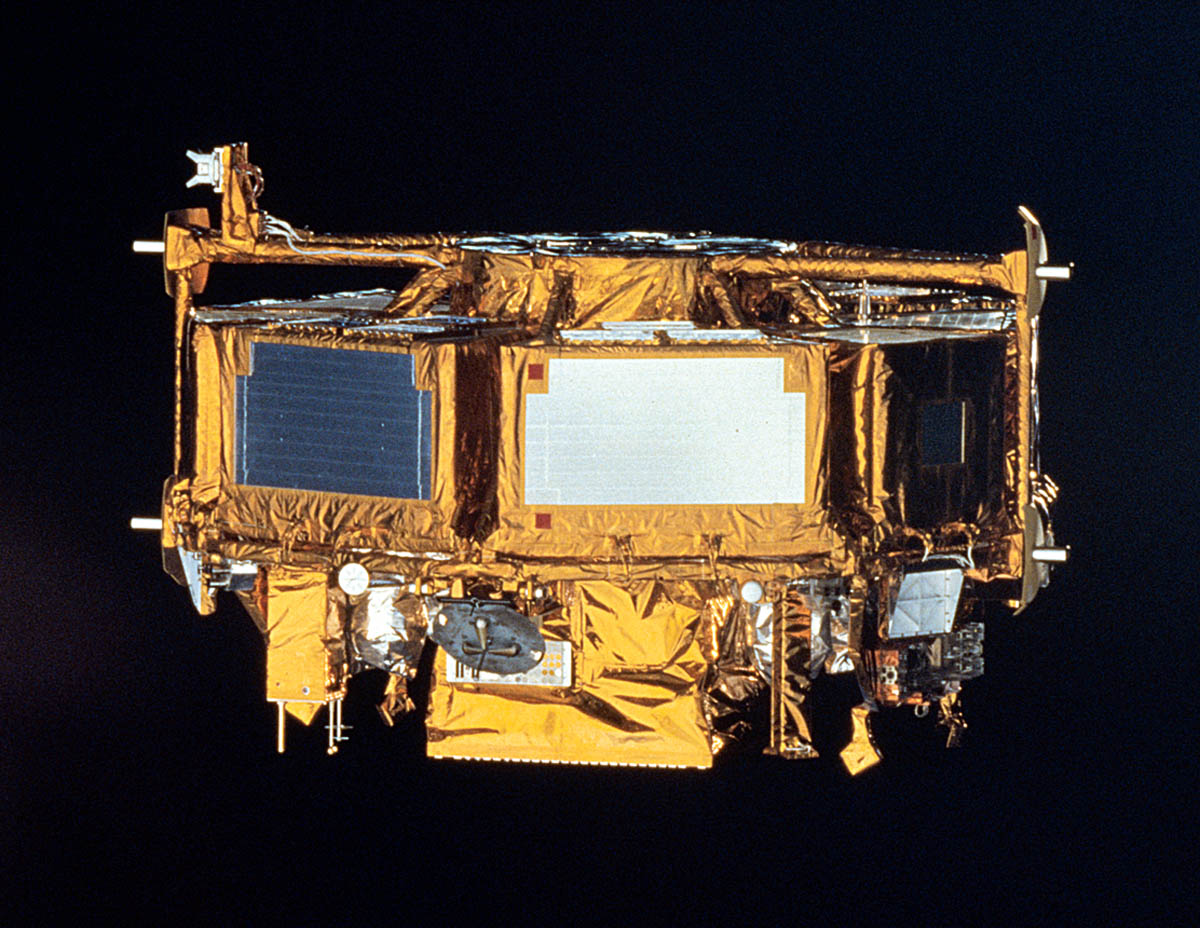
SFU after panel jettison.

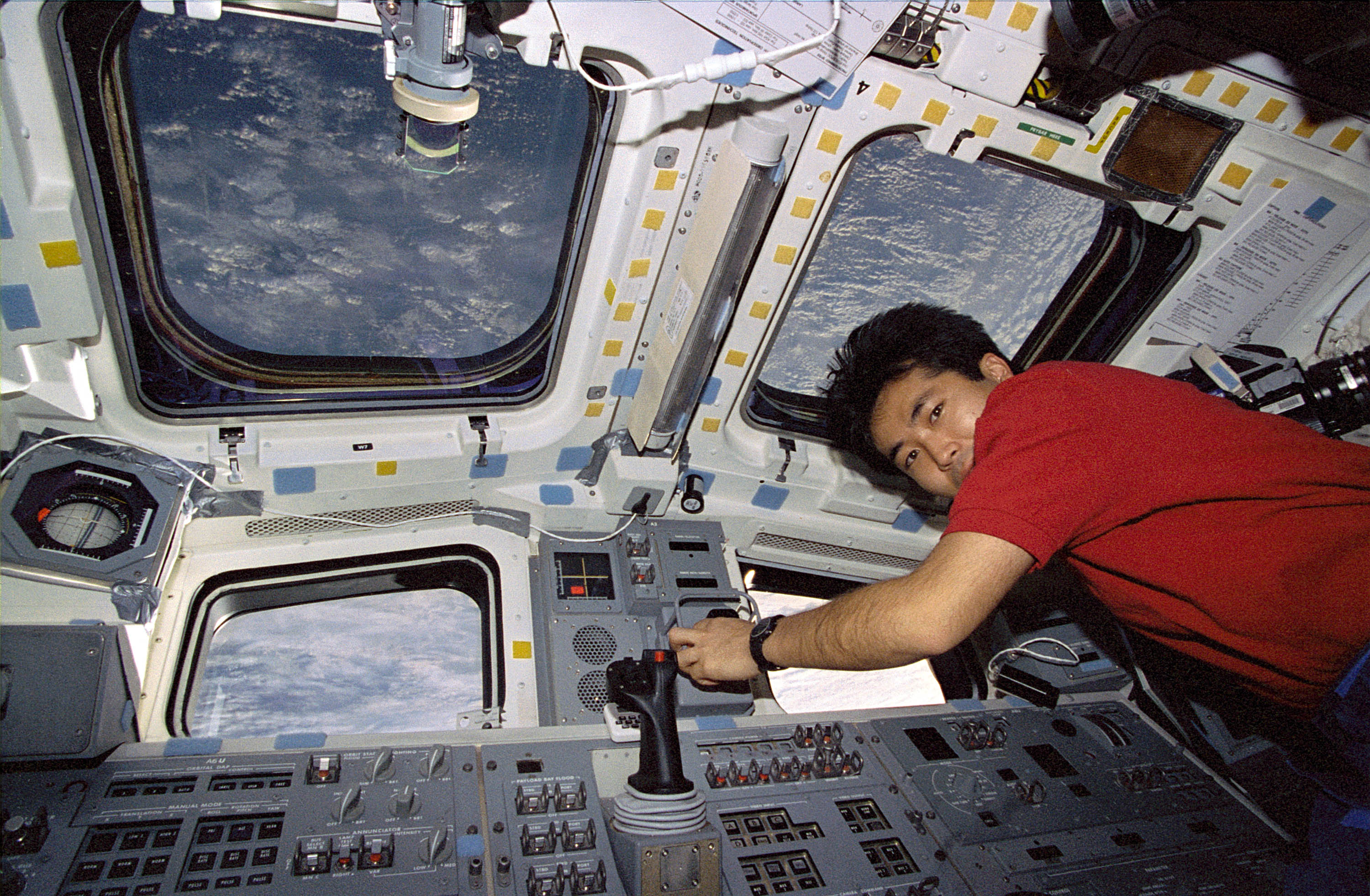
MS Koichi Wakata on the flight deck.

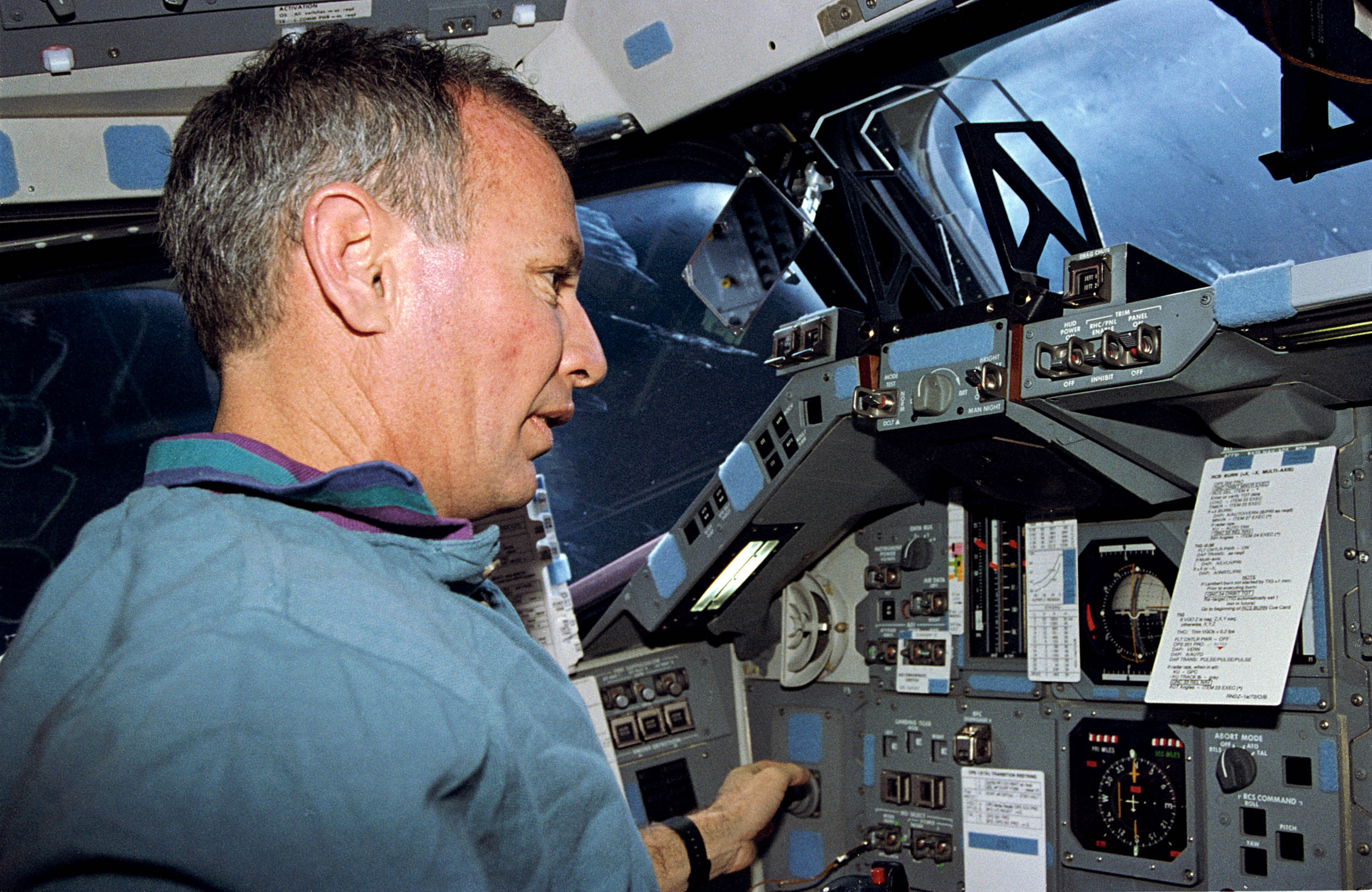
STS-72 Commander Duffy.

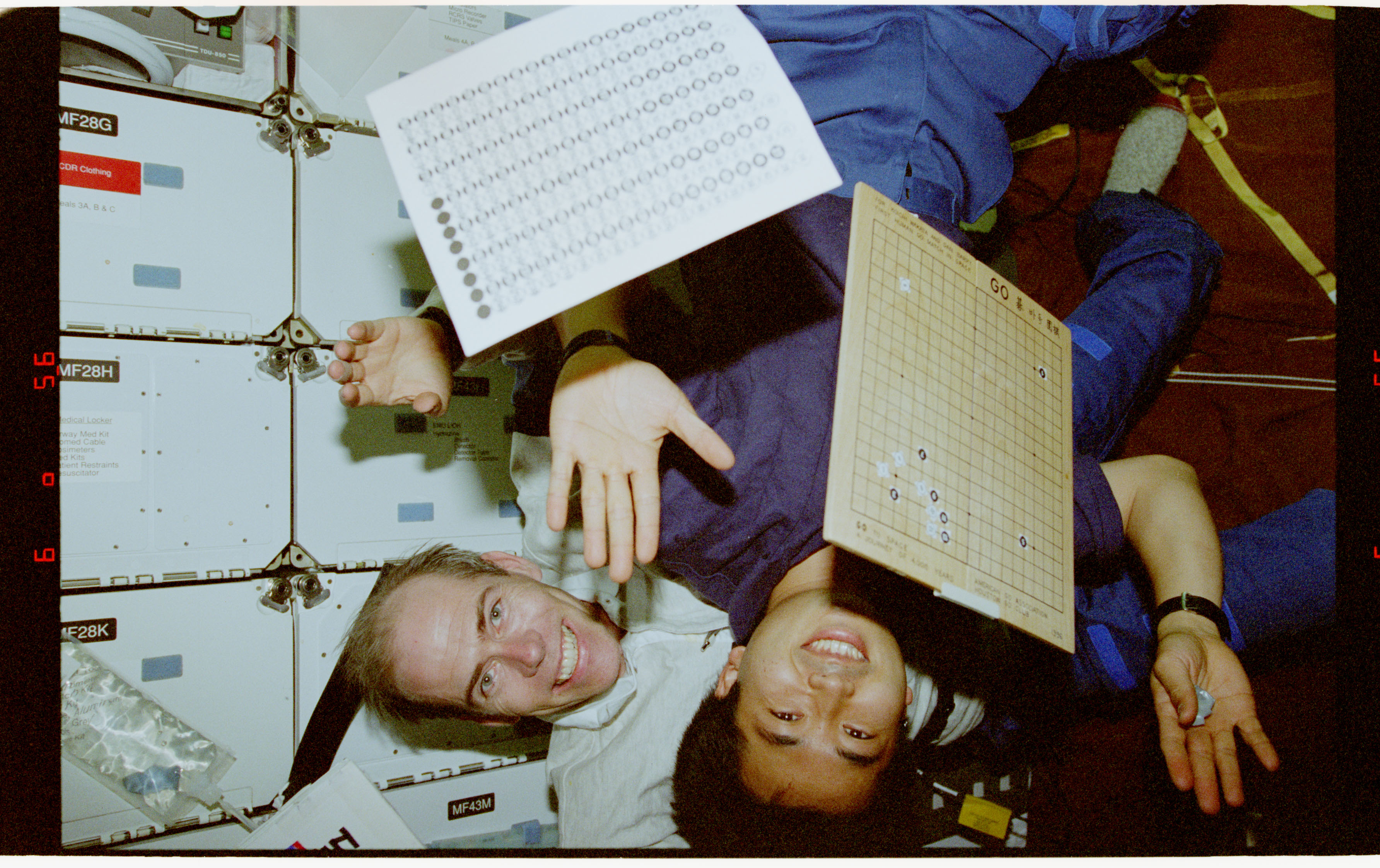
Dan Barry and Koichi Wakata playing Go on the middeck.

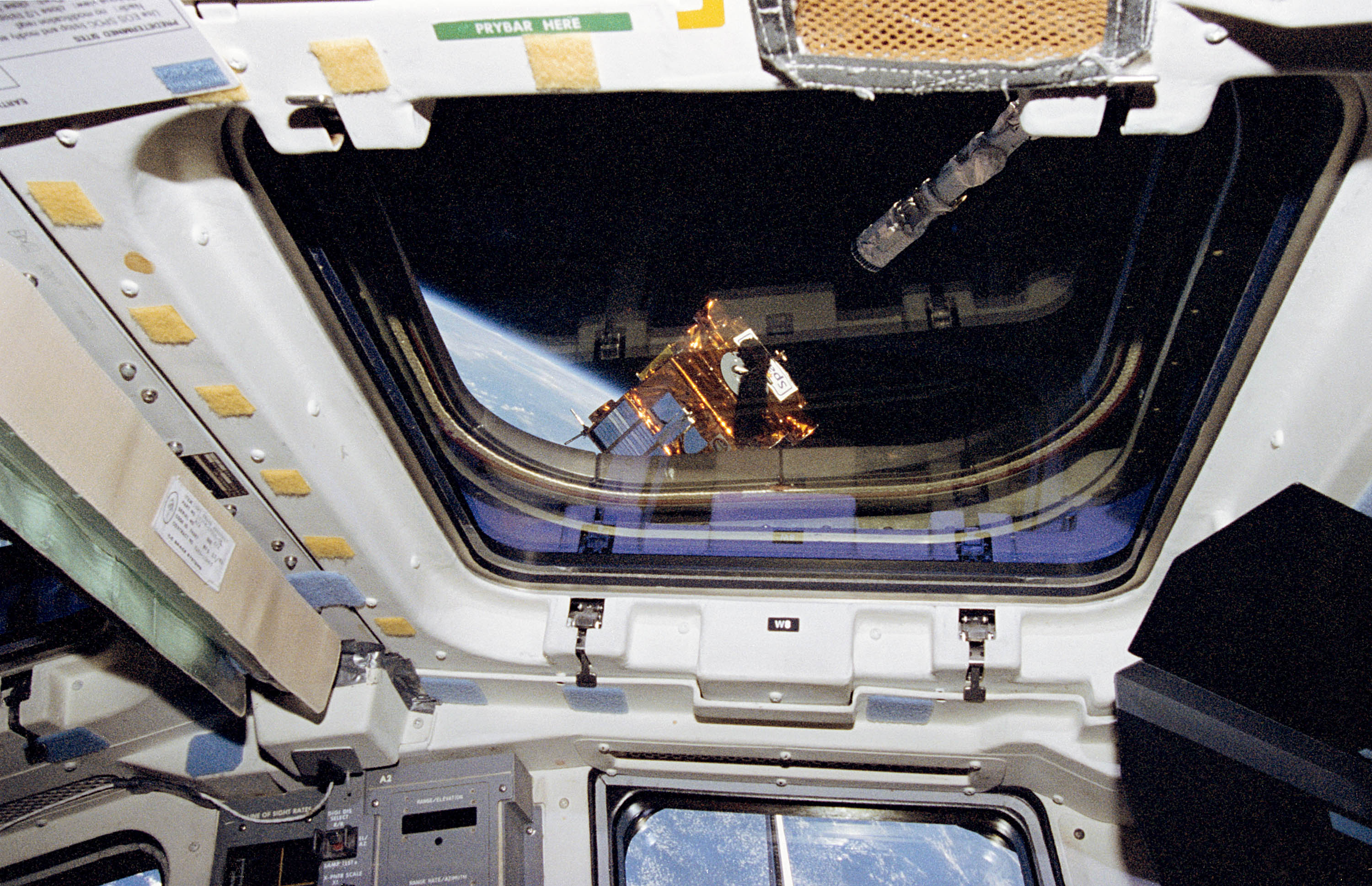
Spartan visible out the windows.

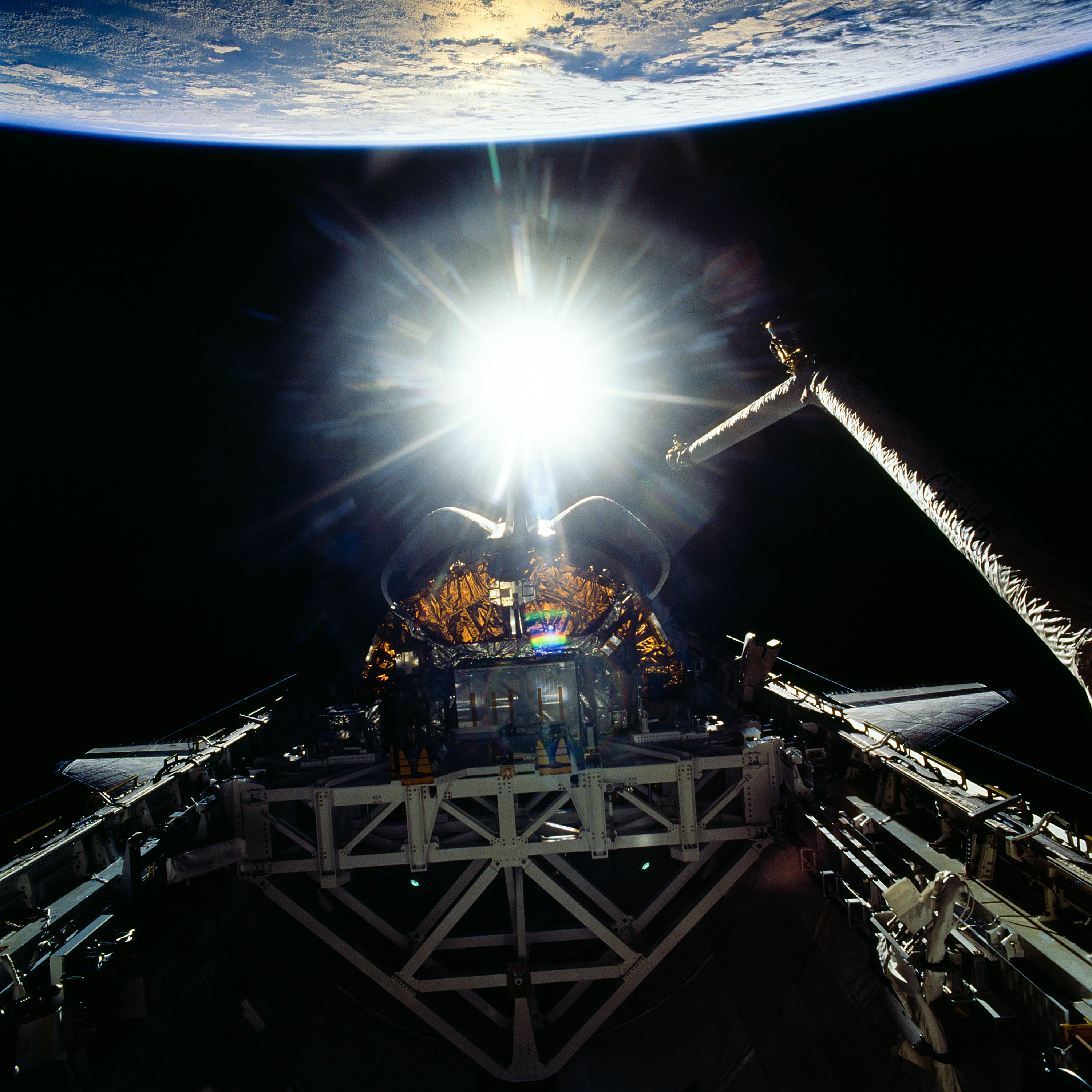
Sunburst over Endeavour.

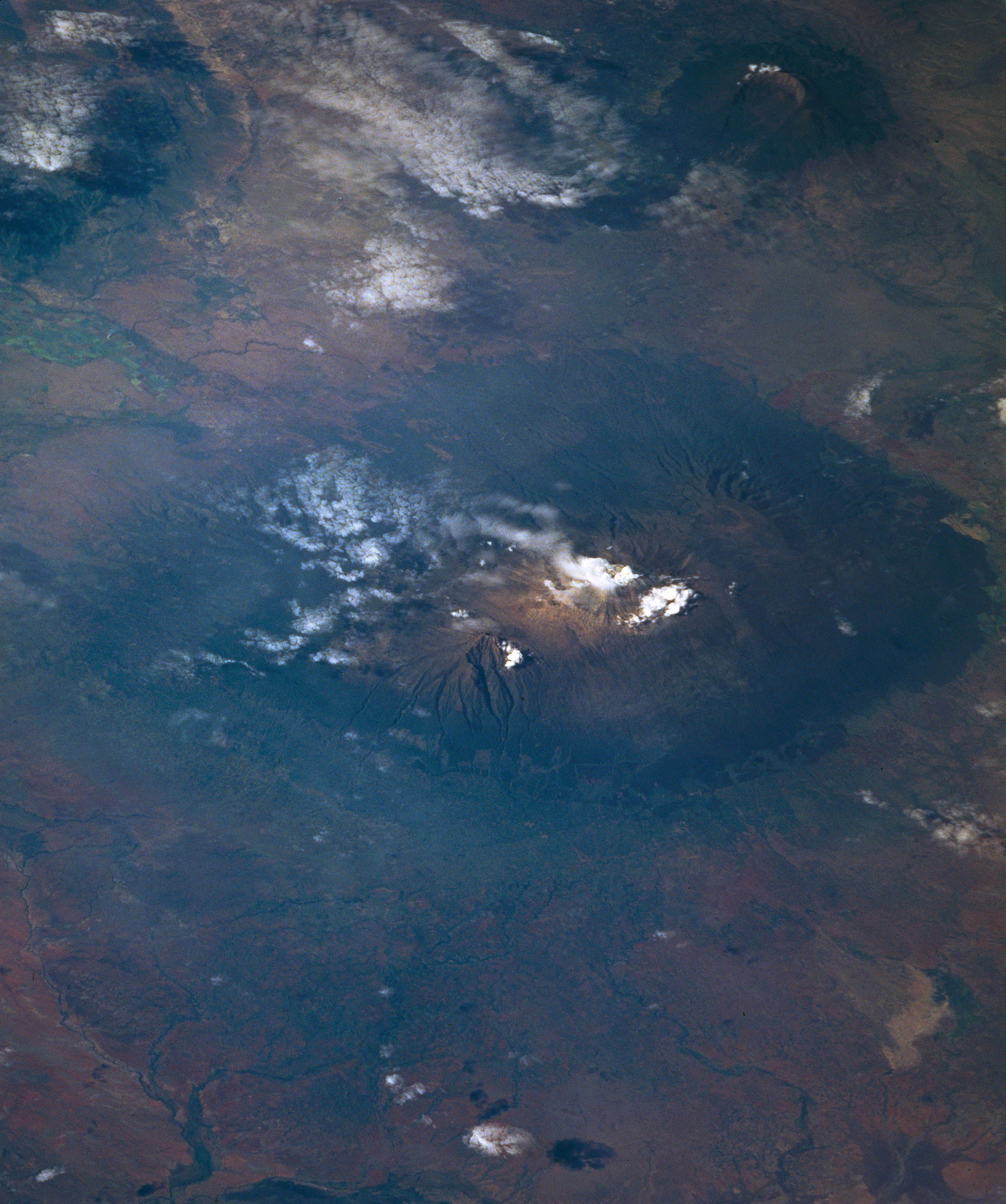
Mt. Kilimanjaro from orbit.

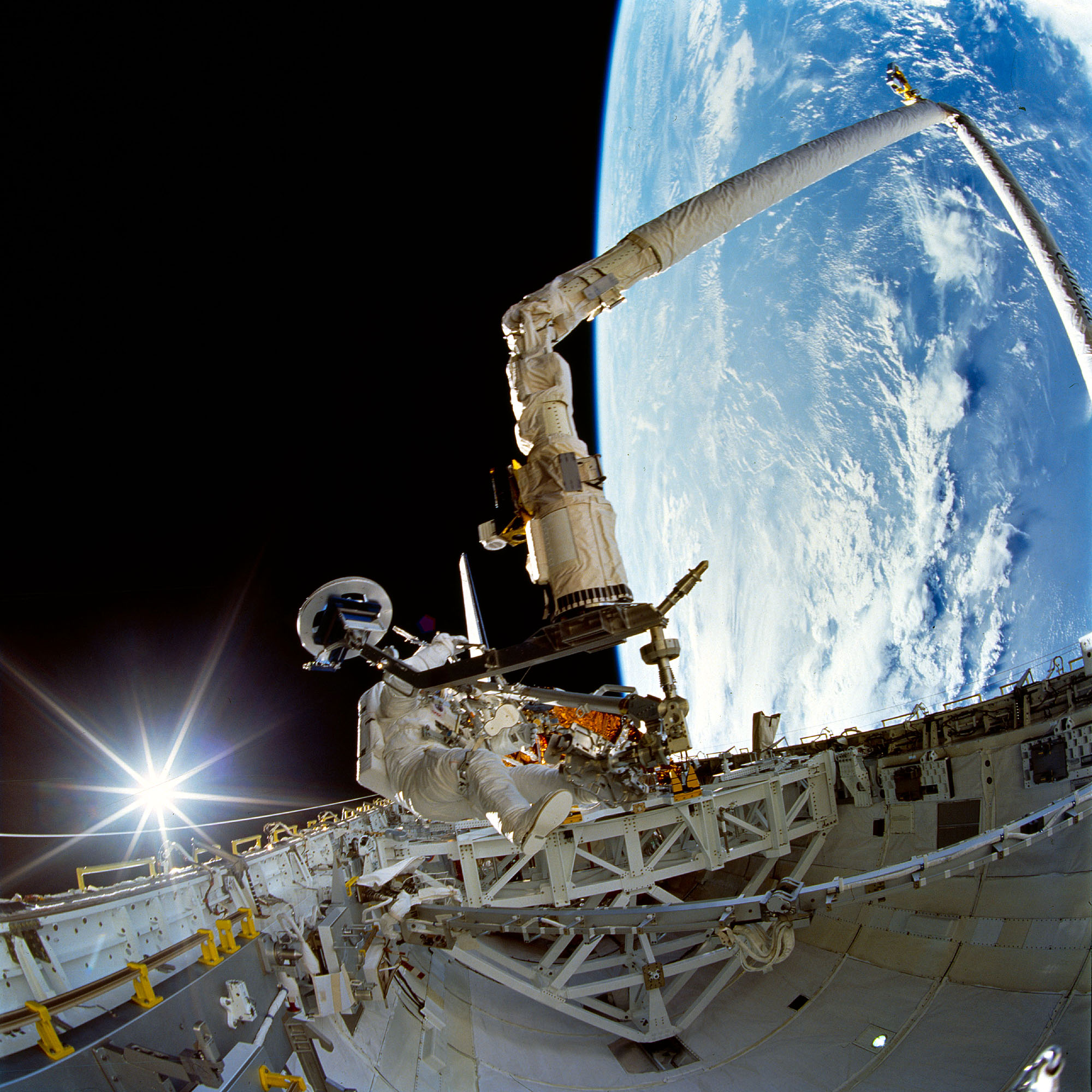
Dan Barry works with the rigid umbilical.

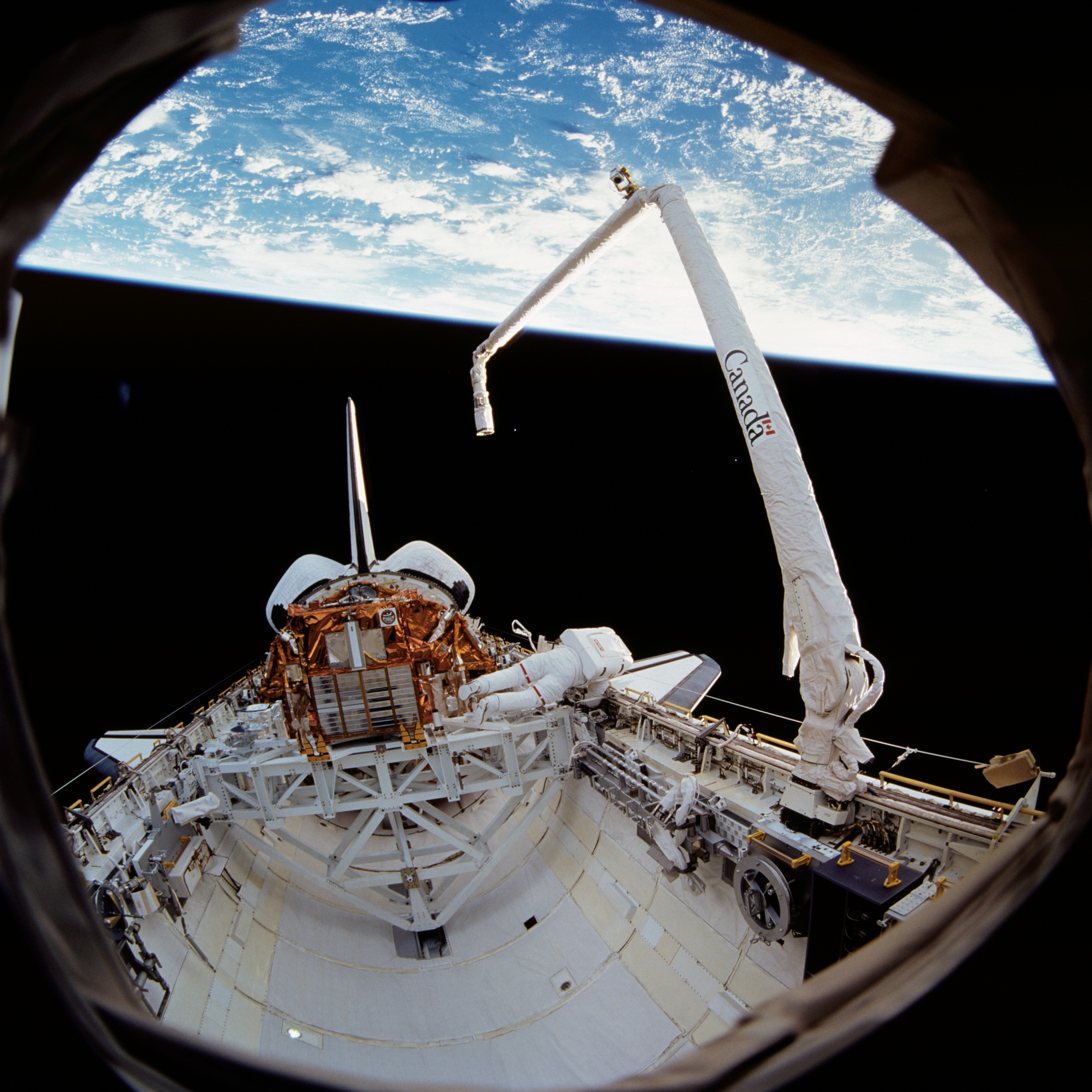
Winston Scott during EVA 2.

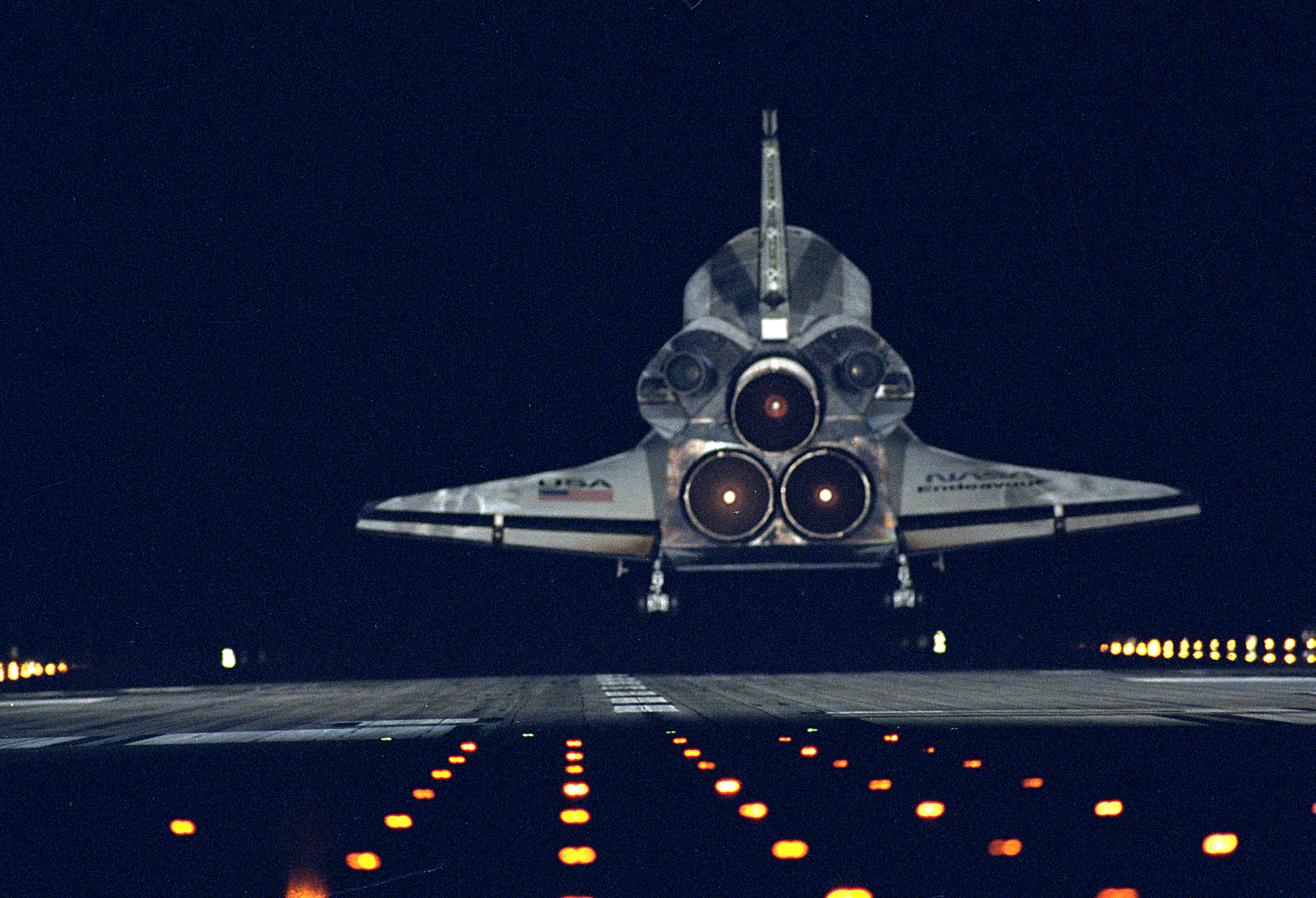
Space Shuttle Endeavour landing after a successful flight.

== See also ==
- List of human spaceflights
- List of Space Shuttle missions
- Outline of space science
- Space Shuttle
- Spartan Packet Radio Experiment
