= Winston 500 =

Winston 500 may refer to the following NASCAR Sprint Cup races:

- Winston 500 (Spring), held at Talladega Superspeedway from 1971 to 1993 and in 1997
- Winston 500 (Fall), held at Talladega Superspeedway from 1998 to 2000

== See also ==
- The Winston, a former name of the annual NASCAR All-Star Race
