= Winston Pond =

Personal details
- Born: Montserrat
- Died: February 20, 2024 Boston, Massachusetts, U.S.

Winston Pond was a geothermal activist and politician from Montserrat. He has contested many elections on the island throughout his career, and most recently ran in the Montserrat General Election of 2014. Pond, along with 6 others, contested the island's by-election for a position on the Legislative Assembly of Montserrat on January 30, 2016. His bid for the legislative seat was unsuccessful.

Pond was also known on the island for his exchange with the then Governor Adrian Davis regarding the government's geothermal energy exploration programmes. In fact, in his 2017 by-election bid, Pond repeatedly expressed his concerns that the Government of Montserrat was taking too long to complete its geothermal exploration project. The project was scheduled to be completed in 2020 but Pond expressed his interest and willingness to work with the United Nations in order to bring geothermal energy to Montserrat by the end of the 2017. Pond's proposal to expedite the geothermal project was described by many as very plausible but now it is very unlikely to happen as he was defeated at the polls.
