= Henry J. Kaiser High School =

Henry J. Kaiser High School, or Kaiser High School, named for Henry J. Kaiser, may refer to:

- Henry J. Kaiser High School (California)
- Henry J. Kaiser High School (Hawaii)
