= Winston Manor (Isle of Wight) =

Winston Manor (also Wenechetone, Wyneston) is a manor house on the Isle of Wight, situated in the Newchurch parish. Judging from the Domesday Book entries, it was an important manor held in part by the king and in part by William and Gozelin, sons of Azor. The king's portion formed two manors with a virgate of land in Soflet and was valued at £3, while the Azor land was held by six tenants and was worth 70s., which makes up a considerable holding if the entries refer to the same place. It seems to have early been among the endowments of Christchurch Twyneham, being confirmed to the convent by William de Redvers, Earl of Devon. In 1241 Richard Quor gave up to the prior all his right in the manor, and the priory still held it at the end of the century as a thirteenth part of a fee. Its further history is not known, but it came in the 19th century into the hands of Mr. Alfred Smith, and as of 1912 it was owned by his daughter's trustees.
