= Patrick Henry Winston (disambiguation) =

Patrick Winston (1943–2019) was an American computer scientist and professor at the Massachusetts Institute of Technology.

Patrick Henry Winston may also refer to:

- Patrick Henry Winston (North Carolina), (1820–1886), lawyer and state legislator
- Patrick Henry Winston Jr. (1847–1903), his son, polymath lawyer and newspaper editor
