= Winston E. Scott =

American navy officer and astronaut (born 1950)

Win Scott
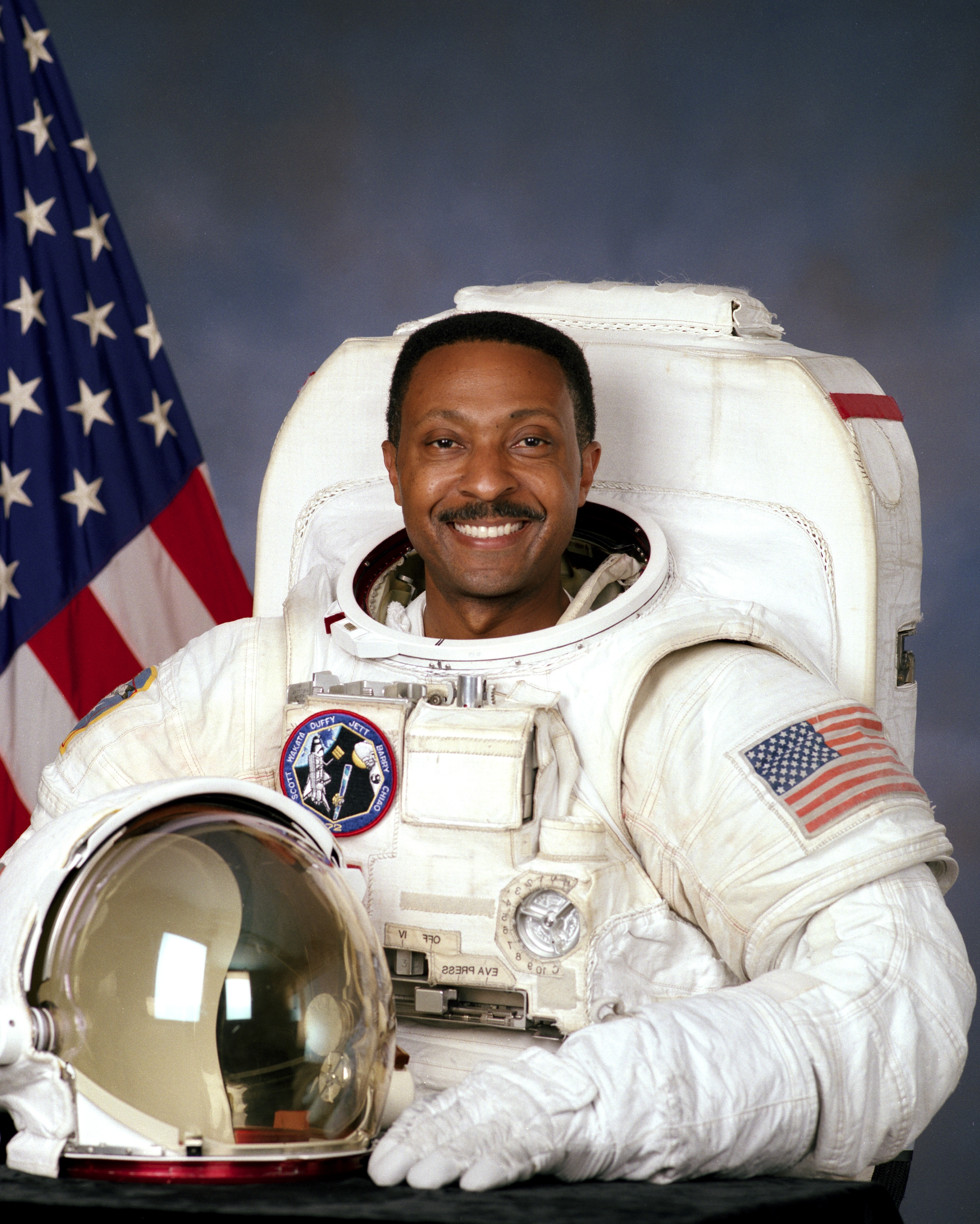
- Born: Winston Elliott Scott; August 6, 1950 (age 76); Miami, Florida, U.S.
- Education: Florida State University (BA); Naval Postgraduate School (MS)
- Space career

NASA astronaut
- Rank: Captain, USN
- Time in space: 24d 14h 35m
- Selection: NASA Group 14 (1992)
- Total EVAs: 3
- Total EVA time: 19h 26m
- Missions: STS-72; STS-87
- Retired: July 1999

Winston Elliott "Win" Scott (born August 6, 1950) is a retired United States Navy Captain and former NASA astronaut. He served as a mission specialist on STS-72 in 1996 and STS-87 in 1997 logged a total of 24 days, 14 hours and 34 minutes in space, including three spacewalks totaling 19 hours and 26 minutes. Often known by his nickname of "Win", he was also a Naval Aviator and initially flew helicopters and later transitioned to fighter aircraft.

== Education ==
Scott attended George Washington Carver Senior High School until integration occurred in Dade County Schools. He entered Coral Gables Senior High School, from which he graduated in 1968. He was a member of the Coral Gables High band and is remembered as one of the school's best trumpet players. He received a Bachelor of Arts degree in Music from Florida State University in 1972, where he joined Phi Mu Alpha Sinfonia, and a Master of Science degree in Aeronautical Engineering from the U.S. Naval Postgraduate School in 1980.

== Experience ==
Scott entered Naval Aviation via Aviation Officer Candidate School after graduating from Florida State University in December 1972. He completed flight training in fixed-wing and rotary-wing aircraft and was designated a Naval Aviator in August 1974. He then served a four-year tour of duty with Helicopter Anti-Submarine Squadron Light 33 (HSL-33) at the Naval Air Station North Island, California, flying the SH-2F Light Airborne Multi-Purpose System (LAMPS) helicopter.

In 1978 Scott was selected to attend the Naval Postgraduate School at Monterey, California, where he earned his Master of Science degree in aeronautical engineering with an emphasis in avionics.

After completing jet training in the TA-4J Skyhawk, Scott served a tour of duty with Fighter Squadron 84 (VF-84) at NAS Oceana, Virginia, flying the F-14 Tomcat. In June 1986 he was designated an Aerospace Engineering Duty Officer (AEDO). He then served as a production test pilot at Naval Aviation Depot Jacksonville at NAS Jacksonville, Florida, flying the F/A-18 Hornet and the A-7 Corsair II aircraft. He was also assigned as Director of the Product Support (engineering) Department. He was next assigned as the deputy director of the Tactical Aircraft Systems Department at the Naval Air Development Center at Warminster, Pennsylvania. As a research and development project pilot, he flew the F-14, F/A-18 and A-7 aircraft.

Scott has accumulated more than 5,000 hours of flight time in 20 different military and civilian aircraft, and more than 200 shipboard landings.

Additionally, Scott was an associate instructor of electrical engineering at Florida A&M University and Florida Community College at Jacksonville. He currently serves as the Vice President of Florida Institute of Technology.

== NASA career ==
Scott was selected by NASA in April 1992, and reported to the Johnson Space Center in August 1992. He served as a mission specialist on STS-72 in 1996 and STS-87 in 1997, and logged a total of 24 days, 14 hours and 34 minutes in space, including three spacewalks totaling 19 hours and 26 minutes.

Scott retired from NASA and the U.S. Navy at the end of September 1999 to accept a position at his alma mater, Florida State University, as Vice President for Student Affairs. He then served as Executive Director of the Florida Space Authority. His responsibilities included the development of space-related industry and economic initiatives. He represented the State of Florida's interests in the development of space policies and programs and advised the governor and lieutenant governor on all civil, commercial and military space matters. Scott urged then-Governor Jeb Bush to combine the three state space organizations; the Florida Space Authority, the Florida Aerospace Finance Corp and the Florida Space Research Institute, into a single organization. The combination became what is now Space Florida.

Scott subsequently served as the dean of the College of Aeronautics and senior vice president for External Relations and Economic Development at the Florida Institute of Technology in Melbourne, FL. Scott is semi-retired and of this writing serves as the senior advisor to the president of the university.

== Spaceflight experience ==
STS-72 Endeavour (January 11, 1996 – January 20, 1996) was a nine-day flight during which the crew retrieved the Space Flyer Unit satellite (launched from Japan 10-months earlier), deployed and retrieved the OAST-Flyer satellite, and conducted two spacewalks to demonstrate and evaluate techniques to be used in the assembly of the International Space Station. The mission was accomplished in 142 orbits of the Earth and traveled 3.7 million miles. Scott logged a total of 214 hours and 41 seconds in space on the mission, including his first EVA of 6 hours and 53 minutes.

STS-87 Columbia (November 19, 1997 – December 5, 1997) was the fourth US microgravity payload flight, and focused on experiments designed to study how the weightless environment of space affects various physical processes, and on observations of the Sun's outer atmospheric layers. Scott performed two spacewalks; the first, a 7-hour 43 minute EVA, featured the manual capture of a Spartan satellite, in addition to testing EVA tools and procedures for future Space Station assembly. The second spacewalk lasted five hours and also featured space station assembly tests. Testing of the AERCam Sprint was conducted during his EVA. The mission was accomplished in 252 Earth orbits, traveling 6.5 million miles in 376 hours and 34 minutes.

Scott has written a book about his experiences in space, Reflections From Earth Orbit, published by Apogee Books.

== Organizations ==
Scott belongs to the American Institute of Aeronautics & Astronautics, National Naval Officers Association, Naval Helicopter Association, Alpha Phi Alpha fraternity, Phi Mu Alpha Sinfonia fraternity, Shotokan Karate Association, Association of International Tohgi Karate-Do, and Bronze Eagles Association of Texas.

In 2007, he received an honorary degree from Michigan State University for his work in space, which is regarded as a case study in leadership and expert communications. He also spoke at the 2007 commencements at Michigan State, encouraging students to believe in themselves and follow their dreams.

== Personal life ==
Scott was born August 6, 1950, in Miami (Coconut Grove), Florida. He is married to the former Marilyn K. Robinson; they have two children, one of whom has followed in his footsteps as a Naval Aviator and currently serves as the commander of Carrier Air Wing Two. Scott enjoys martial arts and holds a second-degree black belt in Shotokan karate. He also enjoys music, and plays trumpet with a Houston-based big band. In addition to flying general aviation aircraft, he is an electronics hobbyist.

== See also ==
- List of African-American astronauts
- List of Sinfonians
