= Winston Bakboord =

Dutch footballer

Personal information
- Full name: Winston Bakboord
- Date of birth: 24 December 1971 (age 54)
- Place of birth: Rotterdam, Netherlands
- Position: Defender

Youth career
- Papendrecht
- Spijkenisse

Senior career*
Years	Team	Apps	(Gls)
1992–1995	Excelsior	51	(5)
1995–1998	FC VVV	95	(5)
1998–2000	Helmond Sport	67	(0)
2000–2002	RBC	59	(0)
- * Club domestic league appearances and goals as of 28 July 2016

Winston Bakboord (born 24 December 1971) is a Dutch former professional footballer who made his Eerste Divisie league debut during the 1992–1993 season with club SBV Excelsior.

== Club career ==
Bakboord also played for clubs VVV-Venlo, Helmond Sport and RBC Roosendaal, whom he left in 2002. He played as a defender.
