= Patrick Henry High School =

Patrick Henry High School may refer to:

- Patrick Henry High School (California)
- Patrick Henry High School (Stockbridge, Georgia)
- Patrick Henry High School (Hamler, Ohio)
- Patrick Henry High School (Ashland, Virginia)
- Patrick Henry High School (Glade Spring, Virginia)
- Patrick Henry High School (Roanoke, Virginia)

== See also ==
- Camden High School (Minneapolis), formerly named Patrick Henry High School
