= Christopher Ferguson =

American astronaut (born 1961)

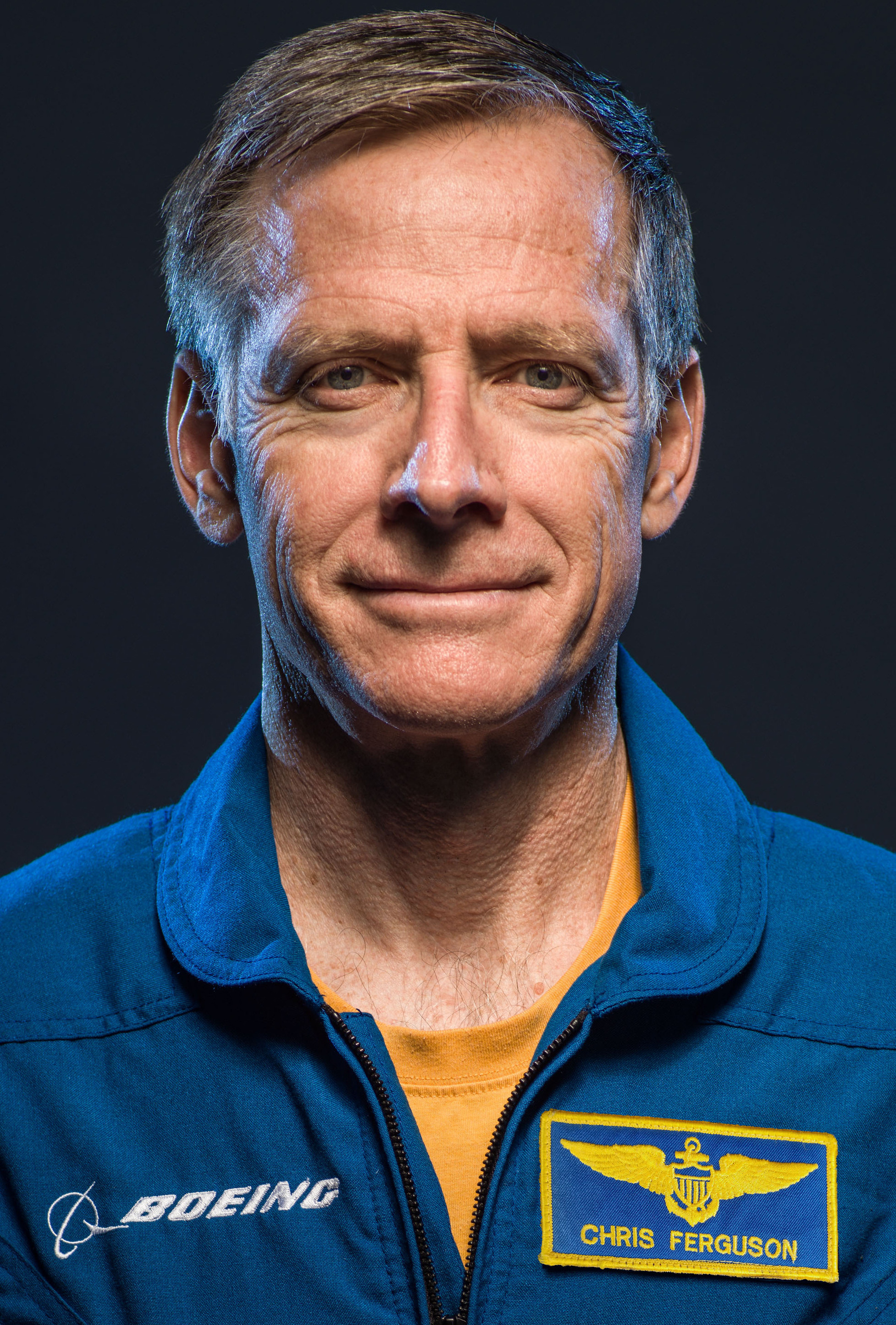
- Ferguson's Commercial Crew program portrait, photographed in 2018
- Born: September 1, 1961 (age 65); Philadelphia, Pennsylvania, U.S.
- Other name: Fergy
- Education: Drexel University (BS); Naval Postgraduate School (MS)
- Space career

NASA astronaut
- Rank: Captain, USN
- Time in space: 40d 10h 3m
- Selection: NASA Group 17 (1998)
- Missions: STS-115; STS-126; STS-135
- Retired: December 9, 2011

Christopher J. "Fergy" Ferguson (born September 1, 1961) is a commercial astronaut and a retired United States Navy captain and NASA astronaut. He was the pilot of Space Shuttle Atlantis on his first mission to space, STS-115, which launched on September 9, 2006, and returned to Earth on September 21, 2006. He then commanded STS-126 aboard Space Shuttle Endeavour. In 2011, he was assigned as commander of STS-135, which was the final mission of the space shuttle program.

On December 9, 2011, he retired from NASA and became director of Crew and Mission Operations for Boeing's Commercial Crew Program. In August 2018, Ferguson was assigned to the first test flight of the Boeing CST-100 Starliner, although he stepped down from the mission in October 2020.

== Education ==
Ferguson was born September 1, 1961, in Philadelphia, Pennsylvania. He graduated from Archbishop Ryan High School in 1979. He received a Bachelor of Science degree in mechanical engineering from Drexel University in 1984, and earned his Master of Science degree in aeronautical engineering from the U.S. Naval Postgraduate School in 1991.

== Military career ==
Ferguson was commissioned from the Navy ROTC program at the University of Pennsylvania. He received his Naval Aviator wings in NAS Kingsville, Texas, in 1986 and was ordered to the F-14 Tomcat training squadron in Virginia Beach, Virginia. After a brief period of instruction, he joined the 'Red Rippers' of VF-11 deploying to the North Atlantic, Mediterranean and Indian Ocean on board the aircraft carrier USS Forrestal. While with VF-11, he also attended the Navy Fighter Weapons School (TOPGUN). He was selected for the United States Naval Test Pilot School program in 1989 and graduated in 1992.

Through June 1994 he was assigned to the Weapons Branch of the Strike Aircraft Test Directorate at the Naval Air Station Patuxent River, Maryland, where he served as the project officer for the F-14D weapon separation program, becoming the first pilot to release several types of air-to-ground weapons from the Tomcat. He served one year as an instructor at the Naval Test Pilot School before joining the 'Checkmates' of VF-211 in 1995 and completing a deployment to the Western Pacific and Persian Gulf in defense of the Iraqi no-fly zone on board USS Nimitz. He briefly served as an F-14 logistics officer for the Atlantic Fleet prior to his selection to the space program.

== NASA career ==
Ferguson was selected for astronaut training in 1998 and completed training as a pilot. Ferguson was the deputy chief of the astronaut office prior to his selection to the STS-135 crew and served as CAPCOM for the STS-118, STS-128, and STS-129 missions.

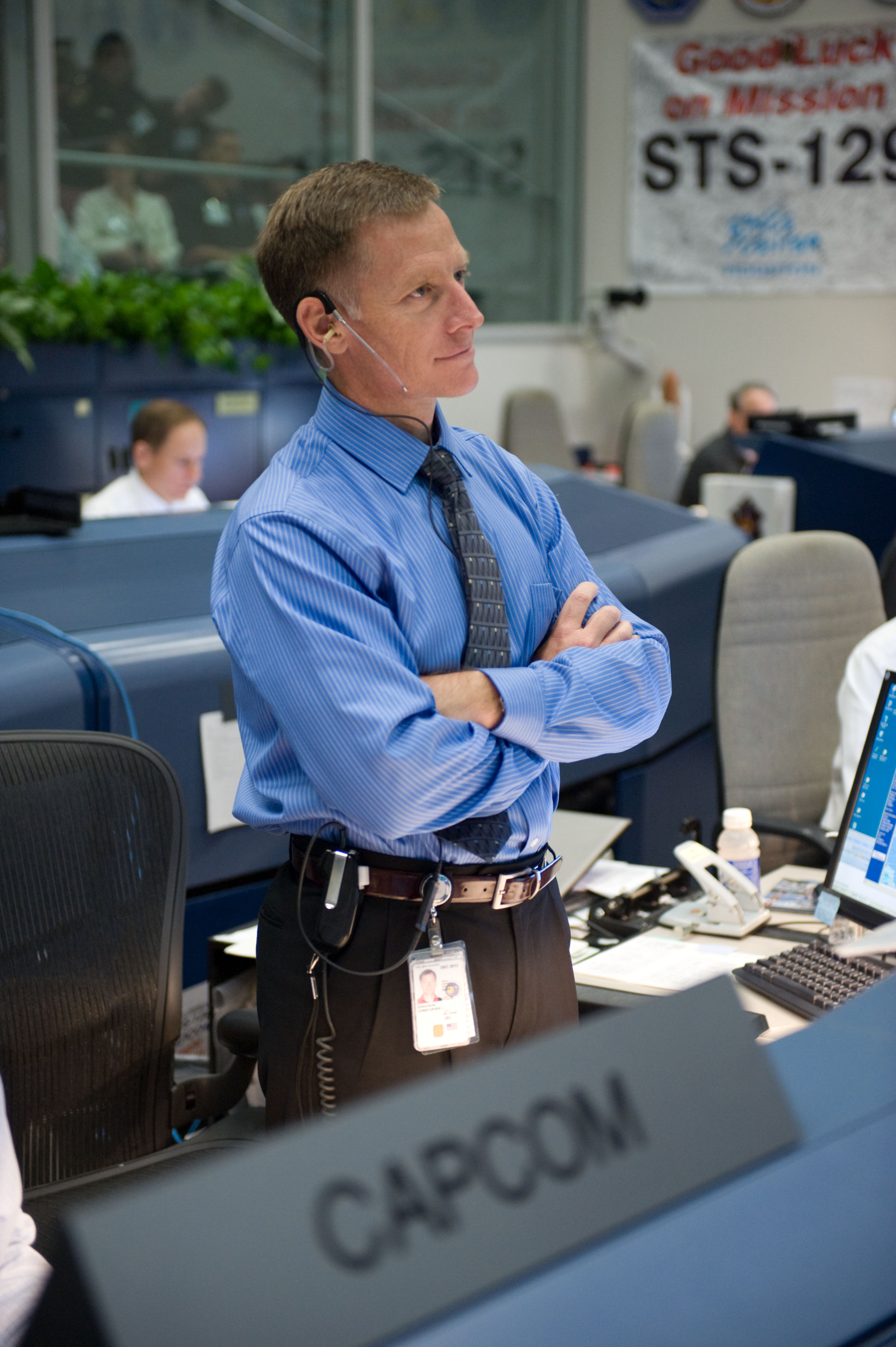
Ferguson as CAPCOM for STS-129

=== STS-115 ===
Ferguson made his first space flight as pilot of STS-115 in 2006. The mission delivered the second port-side truss segment (ITS P3/P4), a pair of solar arrays (2A and 4A), and batteries to the International Space Station. A total of three spacewalks were performed, during which the crew connected the systems on the installed trusses, prepared them for deployment, and did other maintenance work on the station. He returned to Earth after over 11 days on orbit.

=== STS-126 ===
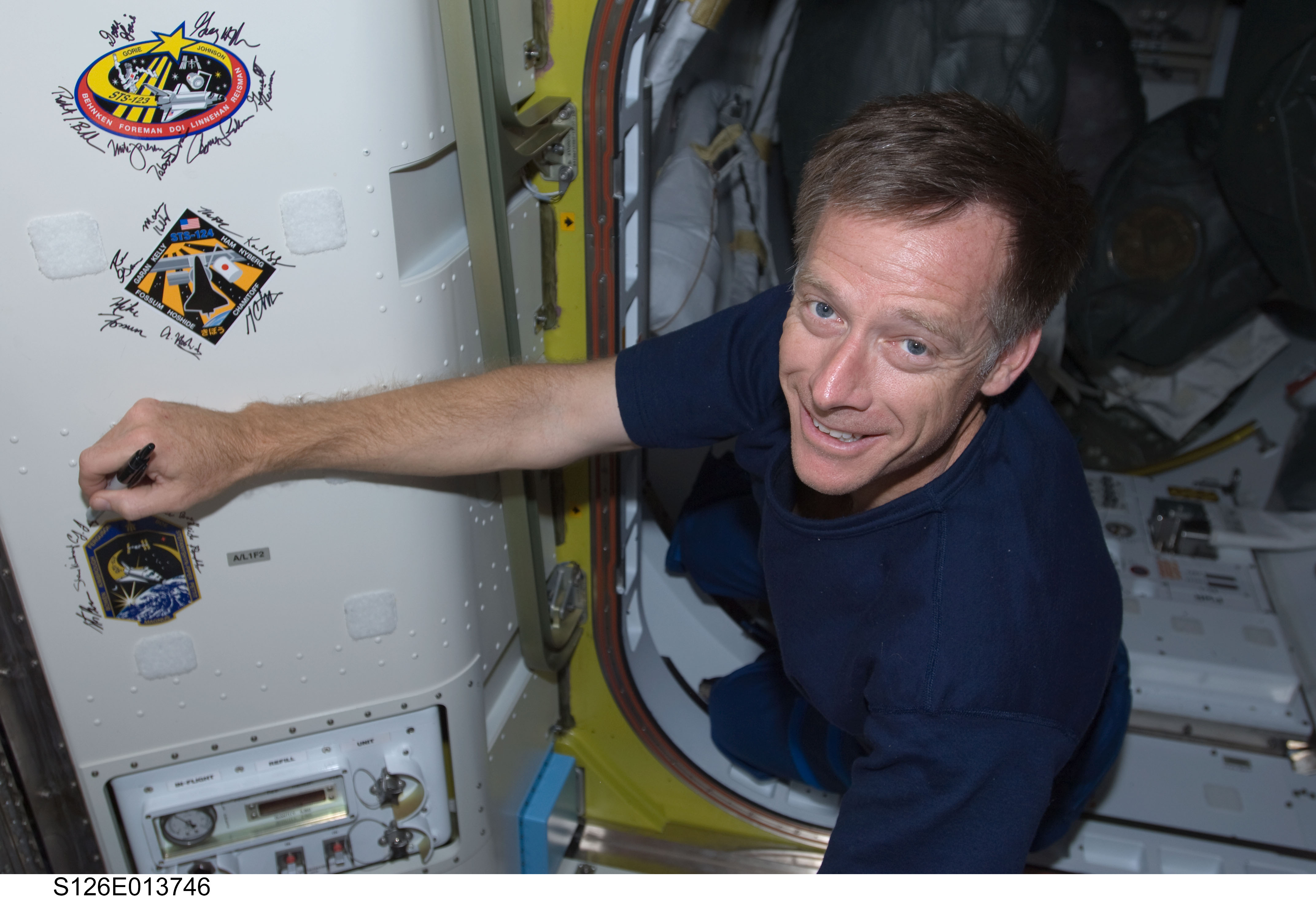
Ferguson signing the STS-126 patch on the ISS

Ferguson returned to space for the second time, as commander of STS-126 in 2008. The purpose of the mission, referred to as ULF2 by the ISS program, was to deliver equipment and supplies to the station, to service the Solar Alpha Rotary Joints (SARJ), and repair the problem in the starboard SARJ that had limited its use since STS-120. He returned to Earth after almost 16 days on orbit.

=== STS-135 ===
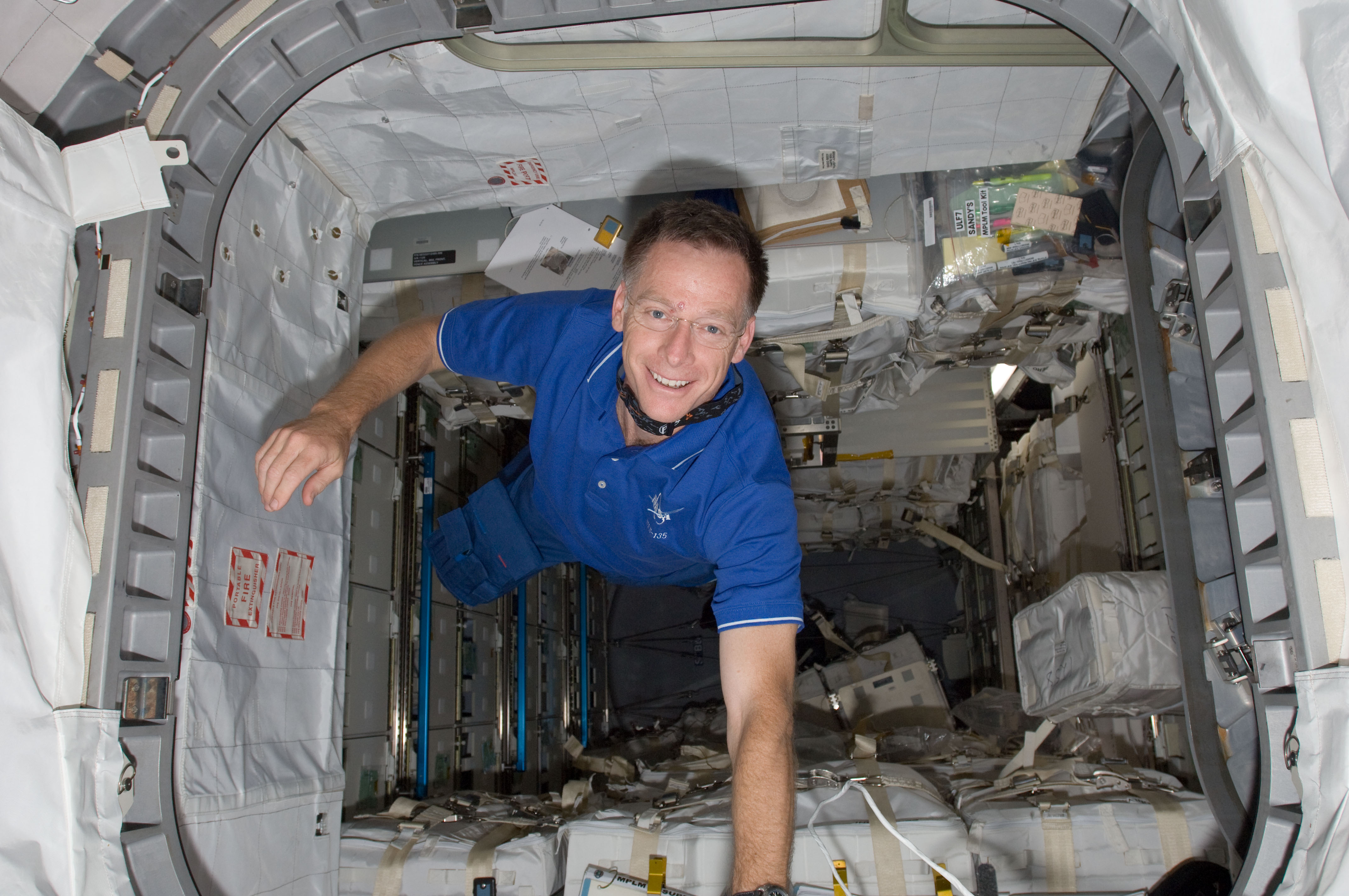
Ferguson pictured onboard the ISS during STS-135

Ferguson made his third and last flight as a NASA astronaut, Commanding STS-135, the final mission of the Space Shuttle. The mission's primary cargo was the Multi-Purpose Logistics Module (MPLM) Raffaello and a Lightweight Multi-Purpose Carrier (LMC), which were delivered to the International Space Station (ISS). The flight of Raffaello marked the only time that Atlantis carried an MPLM. He returned to Earth after 12 days in space.

== Post-NASA career ==
Ferguson retired from NASA in 2011 and Boeing in 2023. While at Boeing, he supported the development of the Starliner for Boeing's Commercial Crew Program. Ferguson was elected to the Astronaut Hall of Fame in January 2022.

=== Boe-CFT ===
In July 2018, Boeing announced his assignment to the first human CST-100 orbital test known as Boe-CFT. He was slated to be the capsule commander with two other NASA astronauts. It was scheduled to launch in 2021. In October 2020, he announced on his personal Twitter that he was stepping down as the commander and didn’t fly on CFT for personal reasons.

== Personal life ==
Ferguson, who is of Scottish and Polish descent, is married to Sandra and has three children. When he was in space for his wedding anniversary, NASA played the Frankie Valli song "Can't Take My Eyes Off You" as the wake-up music that morning, after which Ferguson wished his wife a happy anniversary.
