= Joseph R. Tanner =

American astronaut and engineer (born 1950)

Joseph Tanner
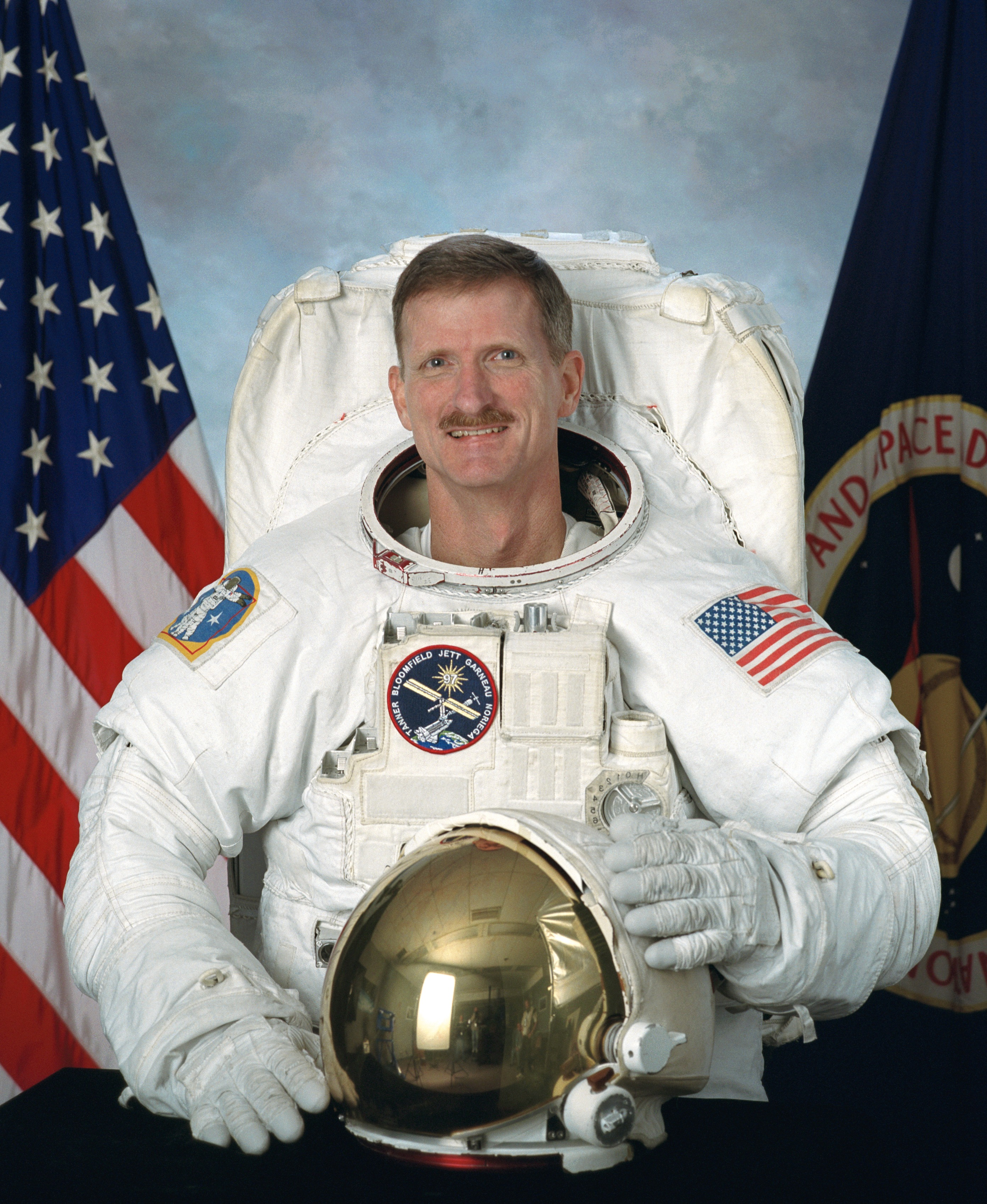
- Born: Joseph Richard Tanner; January 21, 1950 (age 76); Danville, Illinois, U.S.
- Education: University of Illinois Urbana-Champaign (BS)
- Space career

NASA astronaut
- Time in space: 43d 13h 15m
- Selection: NASA Group 14 (1992)
- Total EVAs: 7
- Total EVA time: 46h 29m
- Missions: STS-66; STS-82; STS-97; STS-115
- Retired: August 2008

Joseph Richard Tanner (born January 21, 1950) is an American instructor at the University of Colorado Boulder, mechanical engineer, a former naval officer and aviator, and a former NASA astronaut. He was born in Danville, Illinois. He is unusual among astronauts as he did not have a background in flight test nor did he earn any advanced academic degrees. Typically those who did not do military flight test have an M.D. or Ph.D., if not a master's, whereas Tanner's path to becoming an astronaut followed operational military flying and then into NASA for operational jet training before being selected into the NASA Astronaut Corps in 1992, following an unsuccessful application in 1987.

== Background ==
Tanner was born January 21, 1950, in Danville, Illinois. He is married with two children, sons William and Matthew. Tanner is an Eagle Scout from Troop #19 (Danville, IL) with the Boy Scouts of America. Following graduation from Danville High School in 1968, he attended and graduated with a Bachelor of Science degree in mechanical engineering from the University of Illinois Urbana-Champaign in 1973. His hobbies include swimming, camping, mountaineering, and spending time with his family.

He had an identical twin brother, David, who graduated from Indiana University, Phi Beta Kappa, with a double major in mathematics and physics and also held master's degrees in computer science and exercise science and a Ph.D. in human performance from the Department of Kinesiology at Indiana University.

Tanner's mother comes from Llanddewi Brefi, Wales. He is a cousin of the former National Poet of Wales Gwyneth Lewis.

== Navy service ==
After he graduated from the University of Illinois in 1973 as an engineer, Tanner joined the U.S. Navy. He received his Naval Aviator wings in 1975, before serving as an A-7E pilot with Light Attack Squadron 94 (VFA-94) aboard the USS Coral Sea. He finished his active service as an advanced jet instructor pilot with Training Squadron 4 (VT-4) in Pensacola, Florida.

He has accumulated almost 9,000 hours in military and NASA aircraft, and over 1,000 hours in space, including nearly 50 hours in spacewalks.

== NASA career ==
Hallelujah!

— Tanner's first word on his first spacewalk.

Tanner flew aboard the Space Shuttle Atlantis on the STS-66, November 3–14, 1994, performing the Atmospheric Laboratory for Applications and Science-3 (ATLAS-3) mission. ATLAS-3 was the third in a series of flights to study the Earth's atmosphere composition and solar effects at several points during the Sun's 11-year cycle. The mission also carried the CRISTA-SPAS satellite that was deployed to study the chemical composition of the middle atmosphere and retrieved later in the mission. Tanner logged 262 hours and 34 minutes in space and 175 orbits of the Earth.

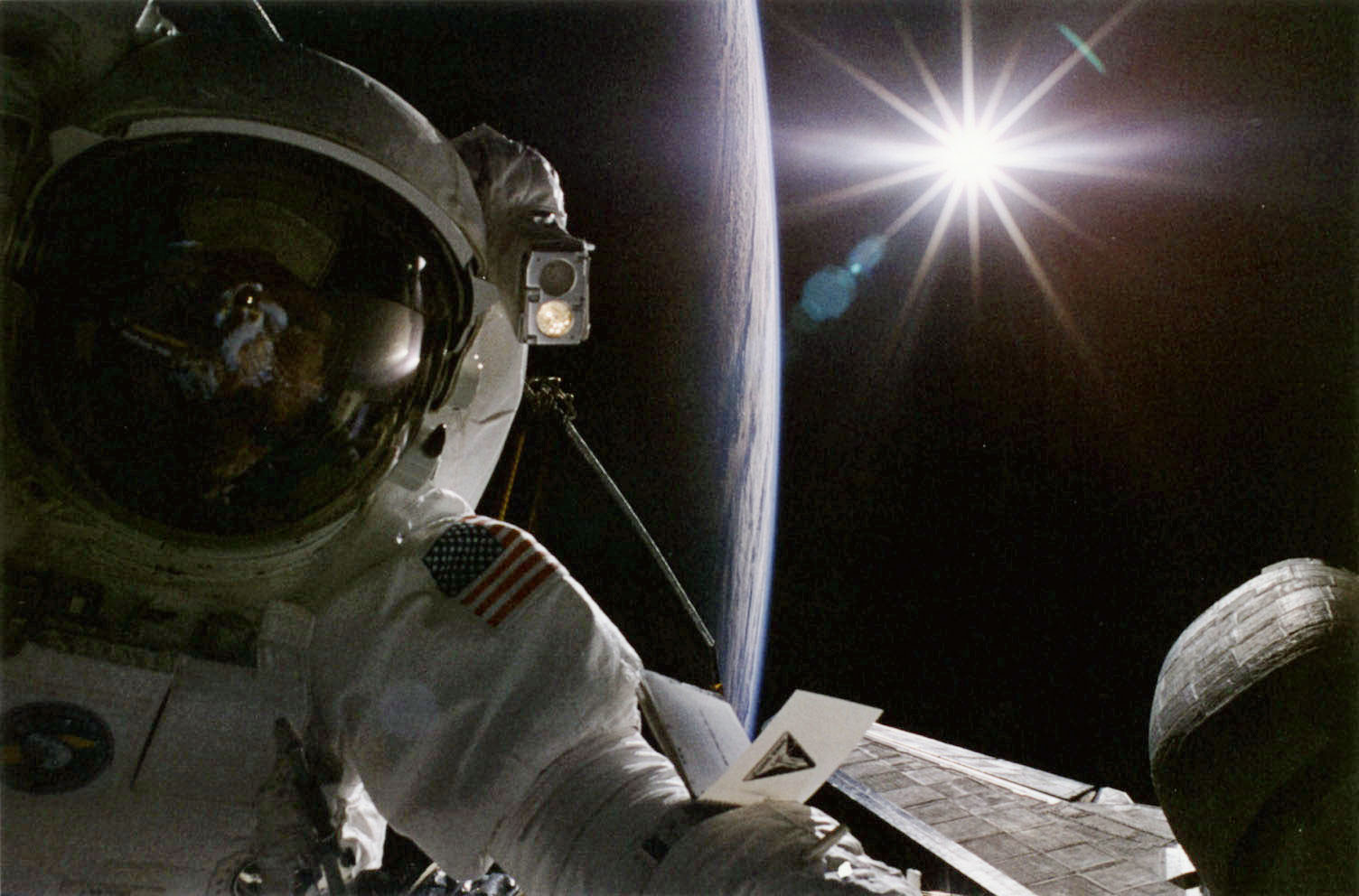
Tanner during his STS-82 EVA

Tanner performed two spacewalks as a member of the STS-82 crew to service the Hubble Space Telescope (HST) in February, 1997. The STS-82 crew of seven launched aboard Space Shuttle Discovery on February 11 and returned to a night landing at Kennedy Space Center on February 21. During the flight the crew completed five spacewalks to improve the science capability of the telescope and replace aging support equipment, restoring HST to near perfect working condition. The crew boosted HST's orbit by 8 nautical miles (15 km) before releasing it to once again study the Universe. Tanner's two space walks totaled 14 hours and 01 minutes. The flight orbited the Earth 150 times covering 4.1 million miles (6,600,000 km) in 9 days, 23 hours, 37 minutes.

Tanner's third mission was STS-97 aboard Space Shuttle Endeavour (November 30 to December 11, 2000), the fifth Space Shuttle mission dedicated to the assembly of the International Space Station. While docked to the station, the crew installed the first set of U.S. solar arrays, in addition to delivering supplies and equipment to the station's first resident crew. Tanner performed three space walks totaling 19 hours 20 minutes. Mission duration was 10 days, 19 hours, 57 minutes, and covered 4.47 million miles (7,190,000 km).

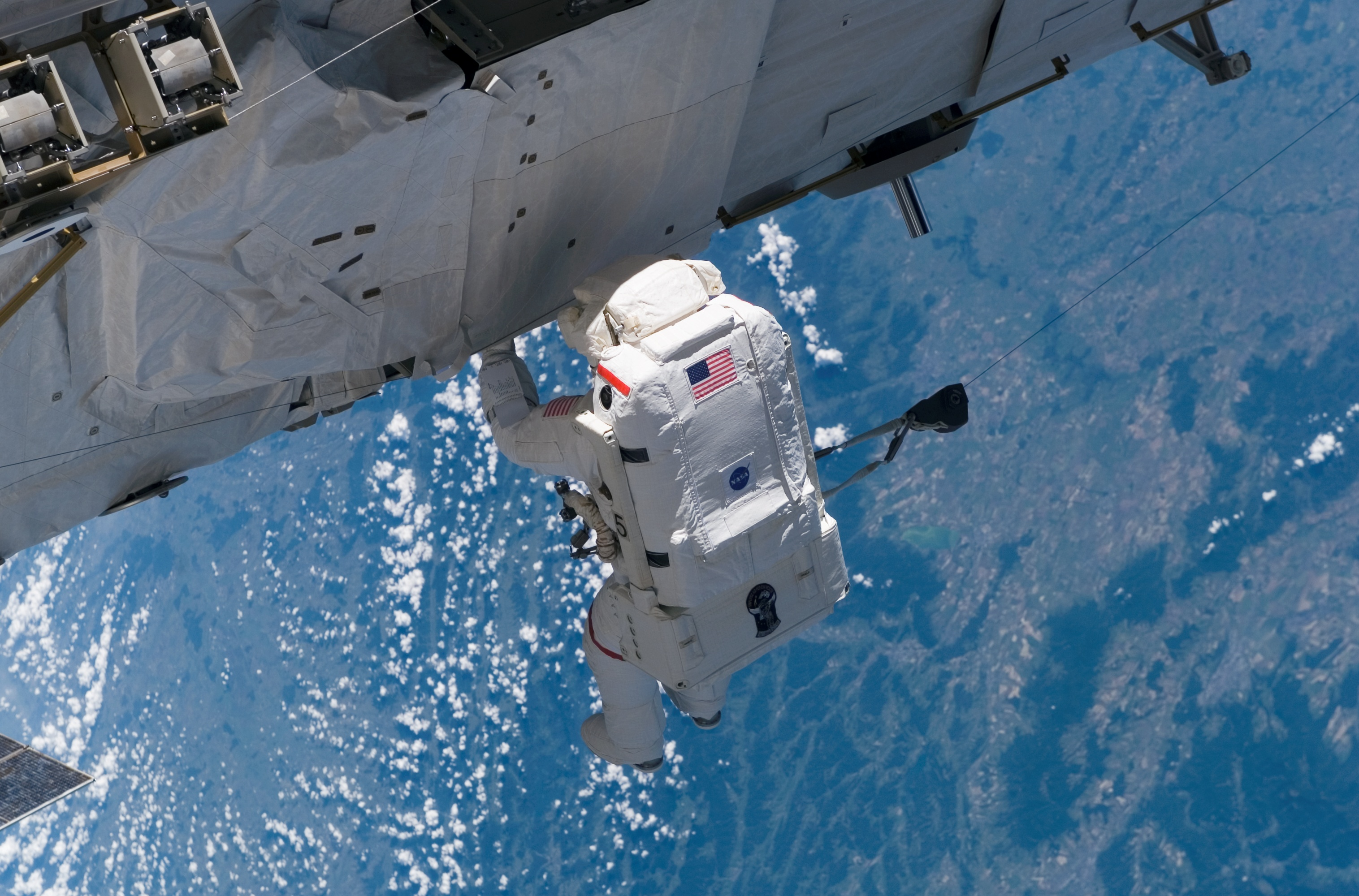
Tanner during his STS-115 EVA

Tanner's fourth mission, STS-115 aboard Space Shuttle Atlantis launched on September 9, 2006. On September 13, he participated in the 5 hour 26 min spacewalk to connect the P3/4 truss to the ISS. STS-115 returned to Earth on September 21, 2006. A photo that he took during his spacewalk was later listed on Popular Science's photo gallery of the best astronaut selfies.

== Post-NASA career ==
Tanner joined the University of Colorado Boulder's Aerospace Engineering Science Department as a senior instructor in September 2008. He assists with senior project course and master's project course. He is also a self-employed aerospace systems consultant.

== Awards and honors ==
- NASA Exceptional Service Medal
- NASA Space Flight Medals (four)
- NASA Stuart M. Present Flight Achievement Award
- JSC Superior Achievement Award
- Outstanding Alumnus of the Department of Mechanical and Industrial Engineering, University of Illinois
- Distinguished graduate from Navy Flight Training
- Captain of the Swimming Team and "Top 100 Seniors" Award at University of Illinois
- Eagle Scout—Troop #19, Prairielands Council, Boy Scouts of America, Danville, IL.
