= STS-115 =

2006 American crewed spaceflight to the ISS

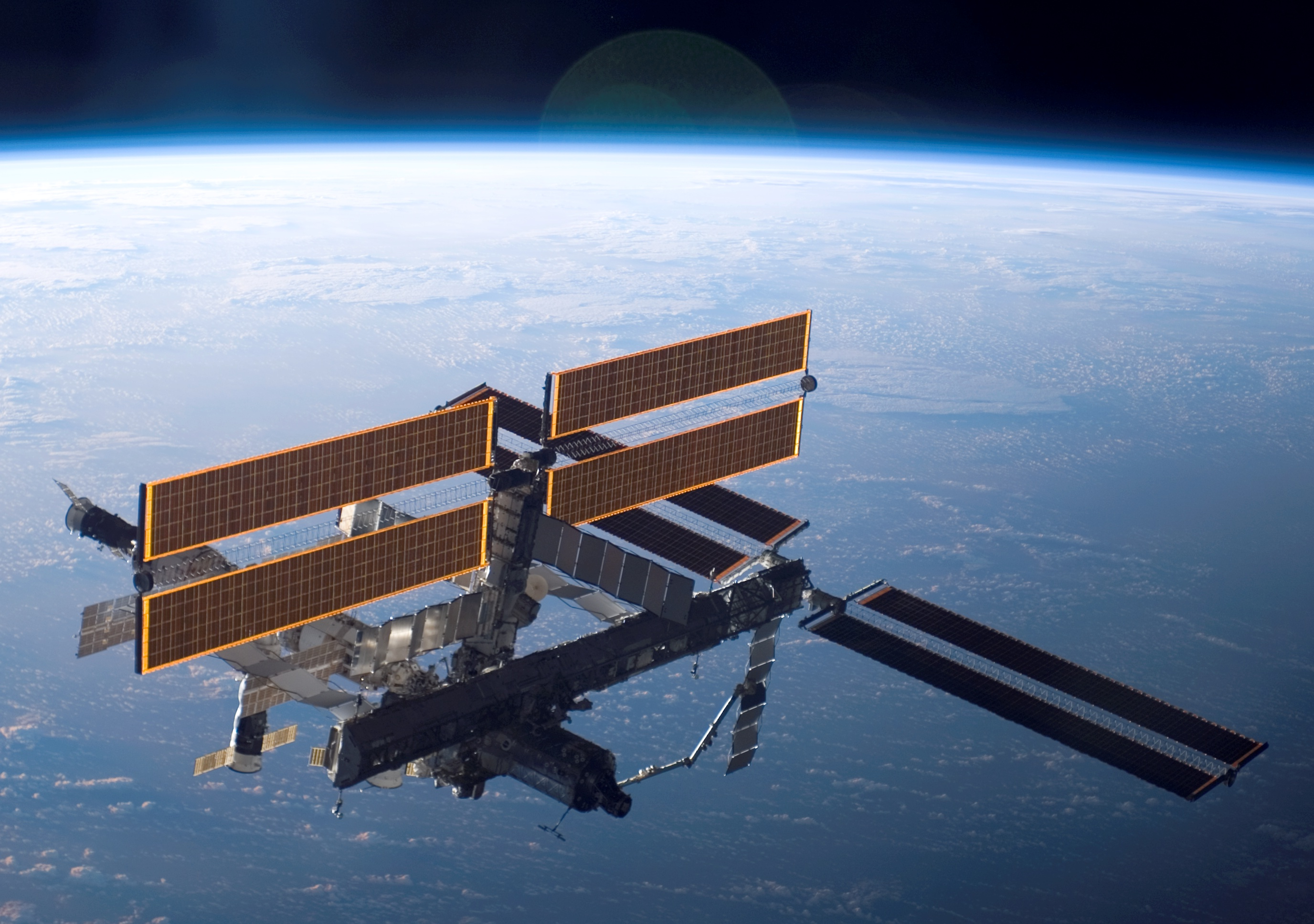
- The ISS above Earth, following the installation of a new truss segment and solar arrays during STS-115
- Names: Space Transportation System-115
- Mission type: ISS assembly
- Operator: NASA
- COSPAR ID: 2006-036A
- SATCAT no.: 29391
- Mission duration: 11 days, 19 hours, 6 minutes, 35 seconds
- Distance travelled: 7,840,000 kilometres (4,870,000 mi)
- Orbits completed: 188

Spacecraft properties
- Spacecraft: Space Shuttle Atlantis
- Launch mass: 122,397 kg (orbiter)
- Landing mass: 90,573 kilograms (199,679 lb)

Crew
- Crew size: 6
- Members: Brent W. Jett Jr.; Christopher Ferguson; Steven MacLean; Daniel C. Burbank; Joseph R. Tanner; Heidemarie Stefanyshyn-Piper

Start of mission
- Launch date: September 9, 2006, 15:14:55 UTC
- Launch site: Kennedy, LC-39B

End of mission
- Landing date: September 21, 2006, 10:21:30 UTC
- Landing site: Kennedy, SLF Runway 33

Orbital parameters
- Reference system: Geocentric
- Regime: Low Earth
- Perigee altitude: 157.4 kilometres (97.8 mi)
- Apogee altitude: 226.6 kilometres (140.8 mi)
- Inclination: 51.6 degrees
- Period: 91.6 minutes

Docking with ISS
- Docking port: PMA-2 (Destiny forward)
- Docking date: September 11, 2006, 10:46 UTC
- Undocking date: September 17, 2006, 12:50 UTC
- Time docked: 6 days, 2 hours, 4 minutes
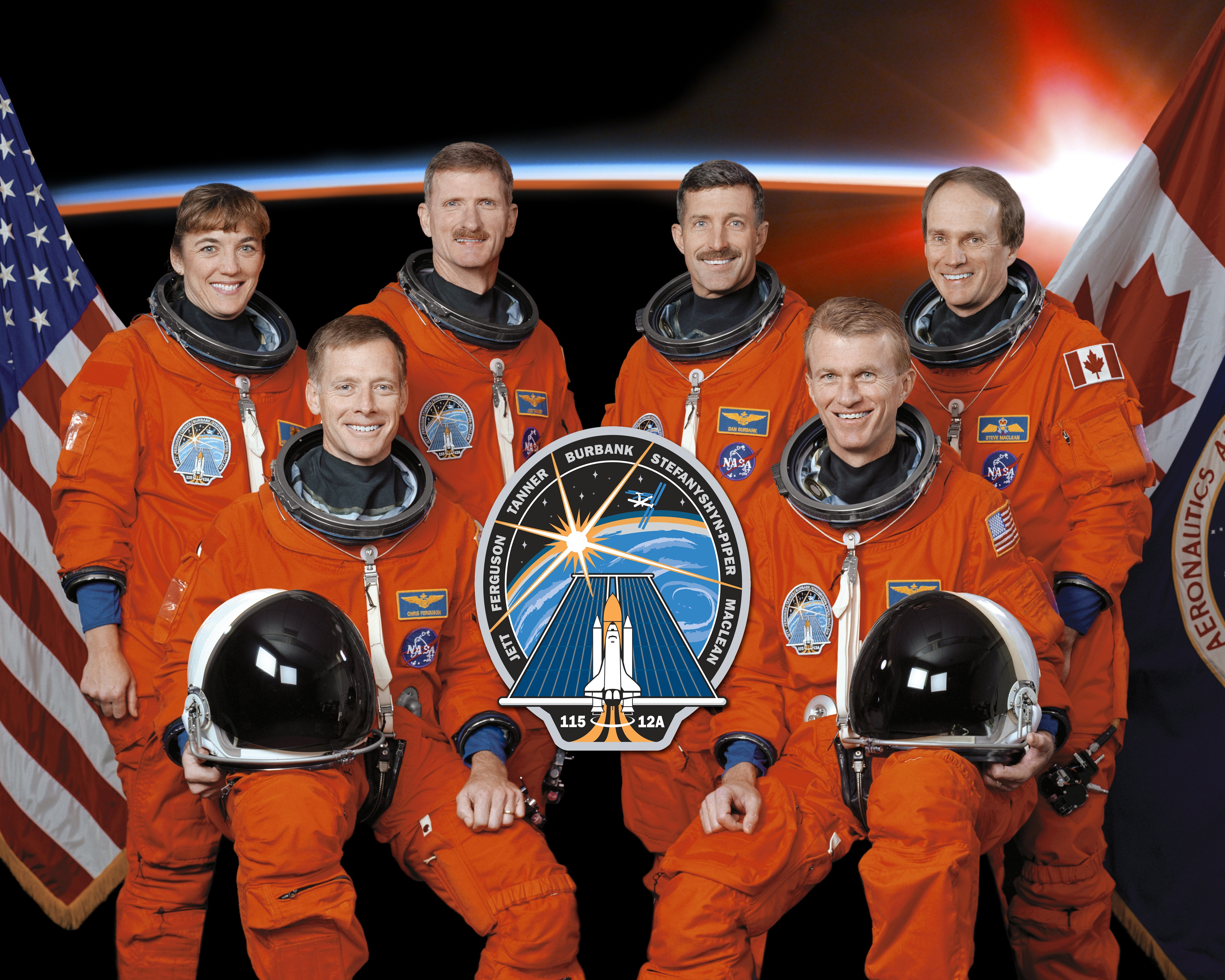
- (L-R) Heidemarie M. Stefanyshyn-Piper, Christopher J. Ferguson, Joseph R. Tanner, Daniel C. Burbank, Brent W. Jett Jr., Steven MacLean Space Shuttle program

STS-115 was a Space Shuttle mission to the International Space Station (ISS) flown by Space Shuttle Atlantis. It was the first assembly mission to the ISS after the Columbia disaster, following the two successful Return to Flight missions, STS-114 and STS-121. STS-115 launched from LC-39B at the Kennedy Space Center on September 9, 2006, at 11:14:55 EDT (15:14:55 UTC).

The mission is also referred to as ISS-12A by the ISS program. The mission delivered the second port-side truss segment (ITS P3/P4), a pair of solar arrays (2A and 4A), and batteries. A total of three spacewalks were performed, during which the crew connected the systems on the installed trusses, prepared them for deployment, and did other maintenance work on the station.

STS-115 was originally scheduled to launch in April 2003. The Columbia accident in February 2003 pushed the date back to August 27, 2006, which was again moved back for various reasons, including a threat from Tropical Storm Ernesto and the strongest lightning strike to ever hit an occupied shuttle launchpad.

== Crew ==
Position	Astronaut
Commander	(United States) Brent W. Jett Jr. Fourth and last spaceflight
Pilot	(United States) Christopher Ferguson; First spaceflight
Mission Specialist 1	(Canada) Steven MacLean, CSA; Second and last spaceflight
Mission Specialist 2 Flight Engineer	(United States) Daniel C. Burbank; Second spaceflight
Mission Specialist 3	(United States) Joseph R. Tanner; Fourth and last spaceflight
Mission Specialist 4	(United States) Heidemarie M. Stefanyshyn-Piper; First spaceflight
Note: The P3/P4 Truss segment and batteries were so heavy (more than 17.5 short tons, or roughly 16 metric tons) that the crew count was reduced from seven to six.

=== Crew notes ===
Canadian Space Agency astronaut MacLean became the first Canadian to operate Canadarm2 and its Mobile Base in space as he was handed a new set of solar arrays from Ferguson and Burbank controlling the original Canadian robotic arm, the Canadarm. MacLean performed a spacewalk, becoming only the second Canadian, after Chris Hadfield to do so.

The mission patch worn on the clothing used by the astronauts of STS-115 was designed by Graham Huber, Peter Hui, and Gigi Lui, three students at York University in Toronto, Ontario, the same university that Steve MacLean attended. The students also designed Steve MacLean's personal patch for this mission.

== Mission payloads ==
The primary payload was the second left-side ITS P3/P4 Truss segment, a pair of solar arrays, and associated batteries.

=== Mission objectives ===
- Delivery and installation of two truss segments (P3 and P4)
- Delivery and deployment of two new solar arrays (4A and 2A)
- Perform three spacewalks to connect truss segments, remove restraints on solar arrays, and prepare the station for the next assembly mission by STS-116

=== Crew seat assignments ===
Seat	Launch	Landing	Seats 1–4 are on the flight deck. Seats 5–7 are on the mid-deck.
1	Jett		Seats 1–4 are on the flight deck. Seats 5–7 are on the mid-deck.
2	Ferguson		Seats 1–4 are on the flight deck. Seats 5–7 are on the mid-deck.
3	MacLean	Stefanyshyn-Piper	Seats 1–4 are on the flight deck. Seats 5–7 are on the mid-deck.
4	Burbank		Seats 1–4 are on the flight deck. Seats 5–7 are on the mid-deck.
5	Tanner		Seats 1–4 are on the flight deck. Seats 5–7 are on the mid-deck.
6	Stefanyshyn-Piper	MacLean	Seats 1–4 are on the flight deck. Seats 5–7 are on the mid-deck.
7	Unused		Seats 1–4 are on the flight deck. Seats 5–7 are on the mid-deck.

== Mission background ==
NASA managers decided to move the STS-115 launch date forward to August 27 to obtain better lighting conditions to photograph the external tank. This occurred before with STS-31 and STS-82. The launch window was co-ordinated with the Soyuz TMA-9 launch in mid-September, which delivered a new ISS crew and fresh supplies to the station. The Soyuz spacecraft operationally did not dock to the station while the Space Shuttle was there.

The mission marks:

- 147th NASA crewed space flight.
- 116th space shuttle flight since STS-1.
- 27th flight of Atlantis.
- 91st post-Challenger mission.
- 3rd post-Columbia mission.
- 1st post-Columbia mission of Atlantis.

== Mission timeline ==
=== Launch preparations ===
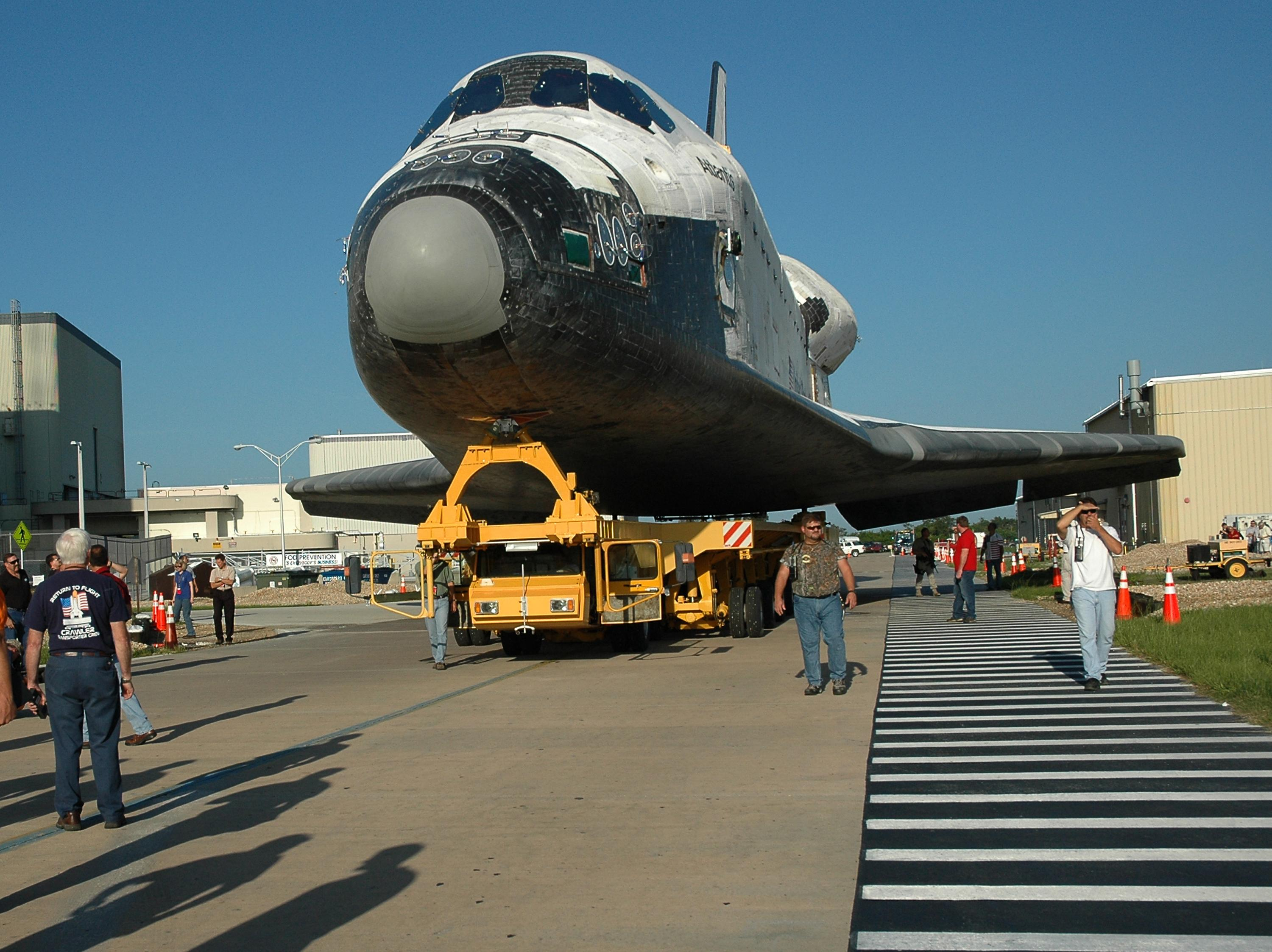
Atlantis is rolled over from the OPF

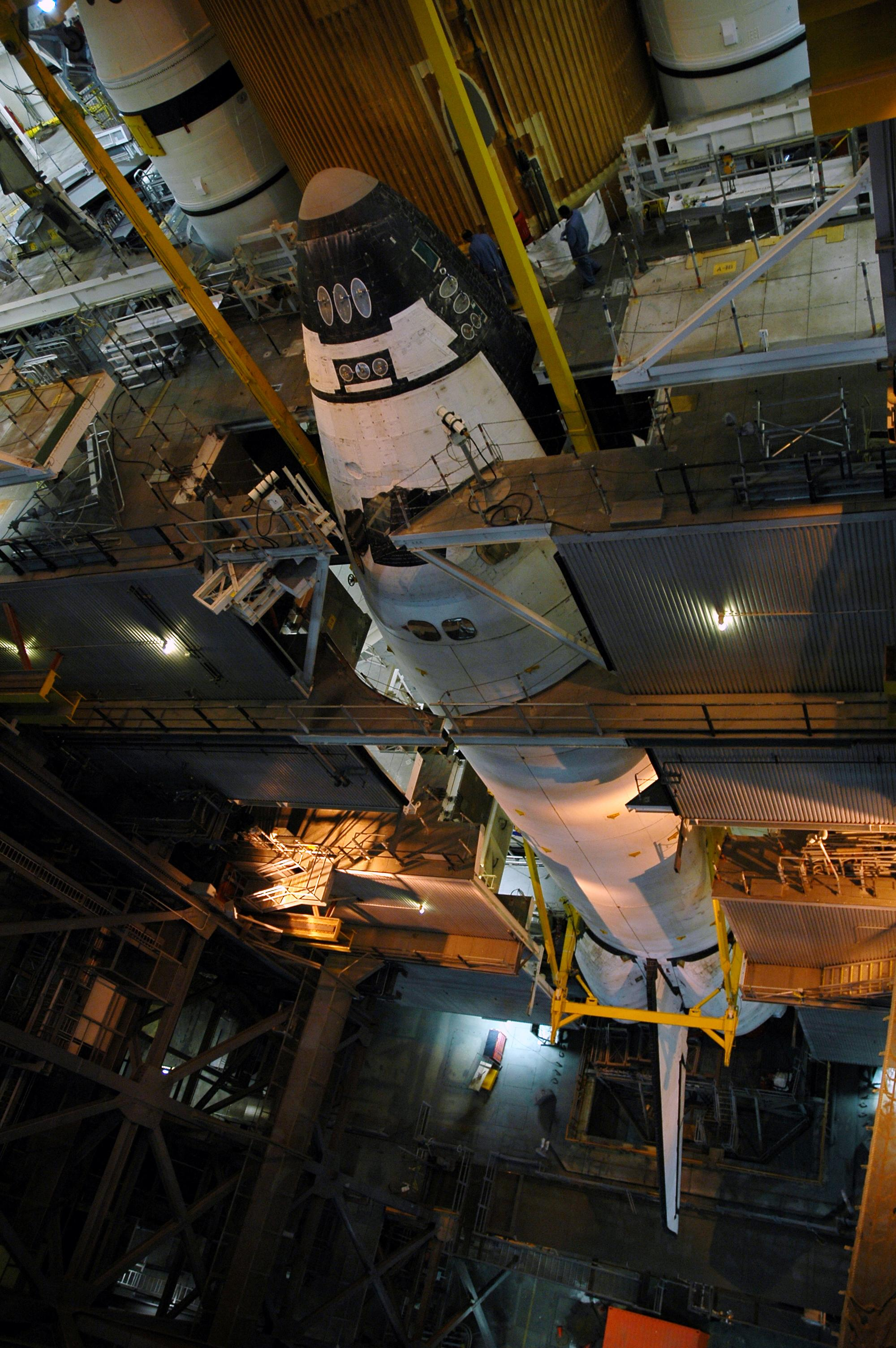
Atlantis, shown in the VAB, ready to be mated to the external tank

Atlantis was rolled out from the Orbiter Processing Facility to the Vehicle Assembly Building (VAB) on July 24, 2006. It was lowered onto the mobile launcher platform on July 26 and rolled out to Pad 39B in the early morning hours of August 2. The rollout was scheduled for July 31, but a storm in the vicinity of the Kennedy Space Center resulted in a delay of two days from fears of the orbiter being hit by lightning, which could cause immeasurable damage.

On the weekend of August 5 to 6, 2006, engineers completed a "flight readiness" check of the shuttle's main engines, which were deemed ready for launch. The crew arrived at the Kennedy Space Center August 7, 2006, for four days of launch rehearsals, including a practice countdown August 10.

Top NASA managers held a Flight Readiness Review (FRR) meeting August 15–16, 2006 to finalize the launch date. Foam loss from the external tank was a key issue at this meeting because on August 13, 2006, NASA announced there was an average amount of loss from the external tank of STS-121, the previous mission. Columbia's demise was due to a piece of foam, shed from its external tank, striking the shuttle's left wing during launch and causing a hole that was breached during re-entry.

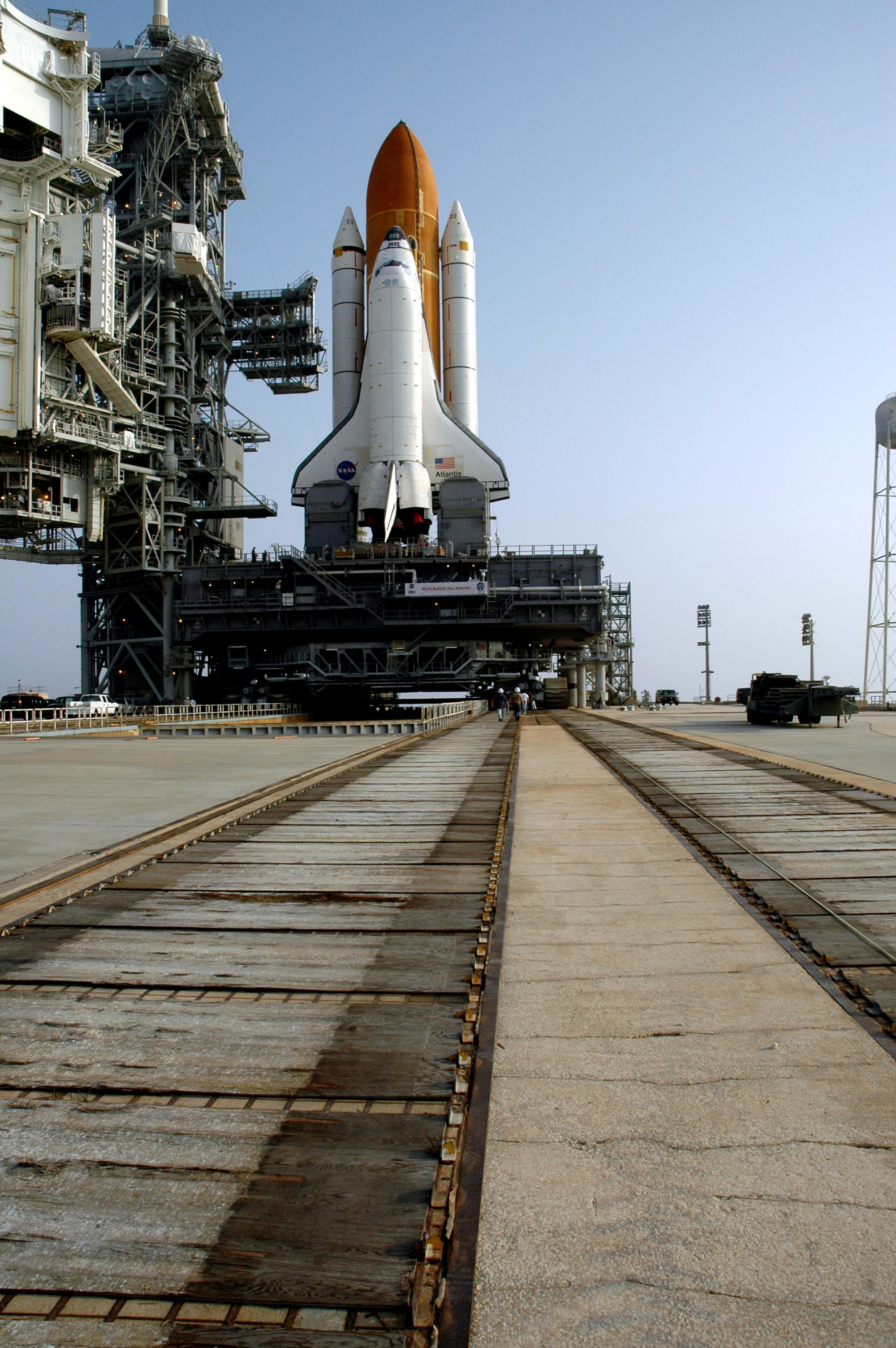
Atlantis on Launch Pad 39B on 2006-08-02.

The meeting also discussed problems with the bolts securing the shuttle's K_{u}-band antenna, which might not have been threaded correctly. The installation had been in place for several flights and hadn't experienced any problems. At the end of the two-day meeting, NASA managers had decided to proceed with the launch on August 27, 2006. However, on August 18, 2006, NASA decided to replace the antenna bolts with Atlantis still on the launch pad. NASA had no procedure to replace these on the pad, but the work was nonetheless completed by August 20, without affecting the planned launch date.

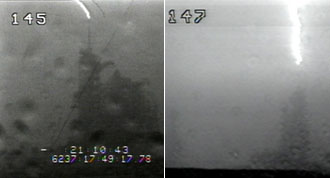
Image of lightning strike

On August 25, 2006, a direct lightning strike, the most powerful recorded at Kennedy Space Center, hit the lightning rod atop the launch pad. As a result, on August 26 the Mission Management Team ordered the mission postponed for at least 24 hours to assess damage. On August 27, the decision was made to postpone the launch for another 24 hours, making the earliest possible launch date August 29, 2006, still unassured that there was no damage from the lightning strike and taking into account the possible threat from Hurricane Ernesto.

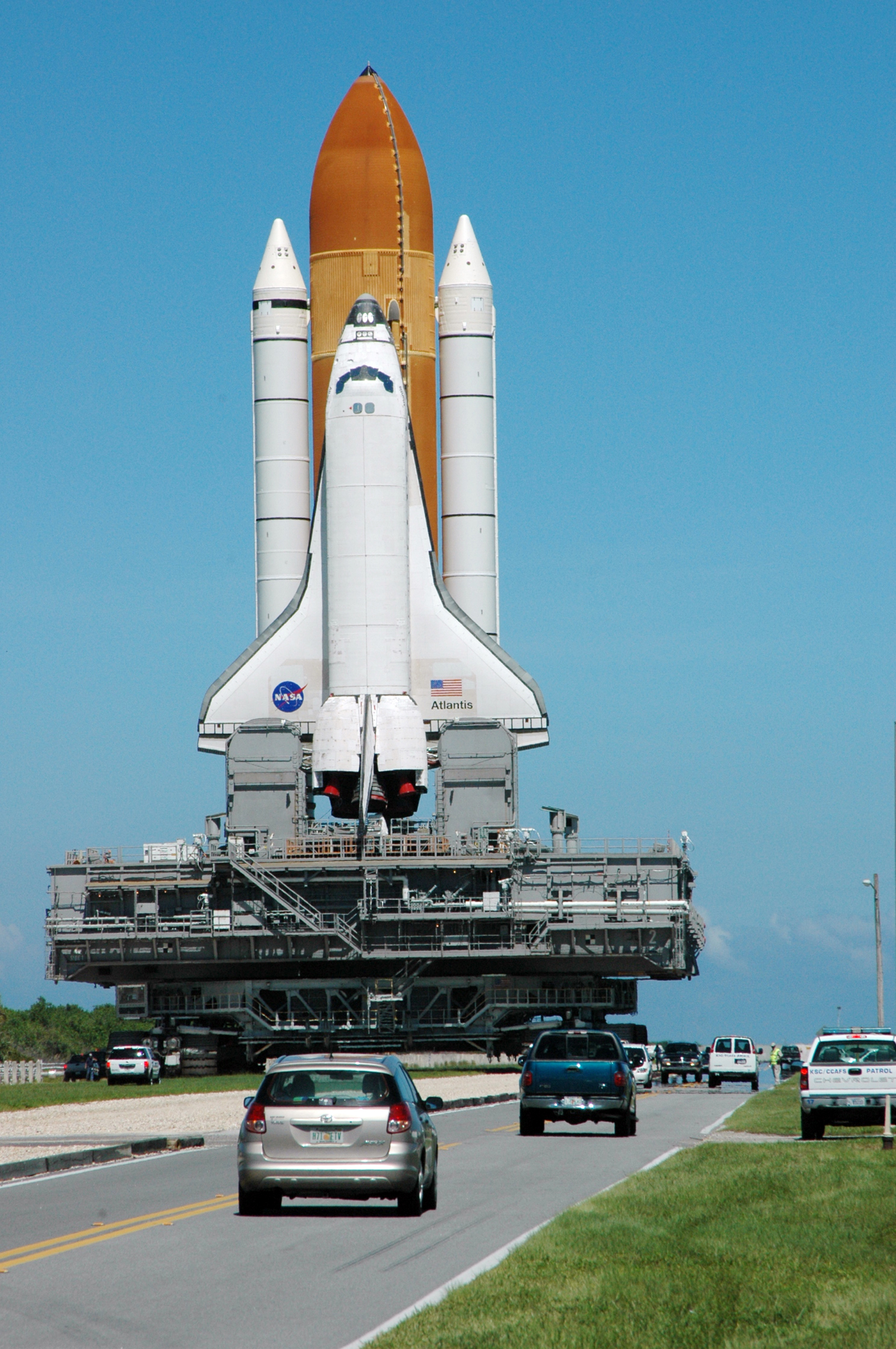
Atlantis heads back to Launch Pad 39B to ride out Ernesto

On August 28, 2006, it was decided to postpone the launch and rollback Atlantis to the VAB after updated forecasts projected Hurricane Ernesto would regain its strength and pass closer to Kennedy Space Center than previously anticipated. NASA began rolling back the shuttle on August 29, 2006, in the late morning, but by early afternoon the decision was made to move Atlantis back to the launch pad (something that has never been done before) to weather out Tropical Storm Ernesto instead. The change came after weather forecasters determined that the storm wouldn't hit Kennedy Space Center as forcefully as they once thought. Its peak winds were expected to be less than 79 mph (126 kilometers per hour), NASA's limit for keeping the shuttle outdoors.

By the early morning of August 31, 2006, the storm had passed and inspection teams began a survey for damage to the launch facilities. Only three problems were discovered, all of which were simple repairs. A target date for launch was set for September 6 with the option to launch for another two days after NASA and Russian space managers agreed to extend the launch window by one day. On the morning of September 3, 2006, the official countdown began at the T minus 43-hour mark, with about 30 hours of scheduled holds. In the early morning of September 6, 2006, engineers observed an apparent internal short when one of the three electricity producing fuel cells was powered up. When engineers couldn't figure out the problem in time, the launch was scrubbed for the day to further analyze the fuel cell problem. Late Wednesday evening NASA managers decided that they would not attempt a launch on Thursday, and scheduled the next launch attempt for September 8, 2006. Originally they had ruled out September 9 as a potential launch date due to a conflict with the planned Russian Soyuz mission Soyuz TMA-9, which was scheduled to, and did, launch on September 18, 2006. This caused some news agencies to report that Friday as the last chance for a launch until October.

=== September 8 (Launch attempt 1) ===
On the morning of September 8, 2006, it was reported that one of the engine cut-off (ECO) sensors in the external tank had failed. About half an hour before the scheduled launch time, NASA announced it had decided to delay the launch for another 24 hours while the fuel was drained out of the external tank and the problem assessed. The sensor in question, ECO sensor No. 3, was proved to be faulty when it indicated that there was still liquid hydrogen in the external tank despite all of it being drained out. The other three ECO sensors correctly indicated a dry tank; and as long as they didn't start to malfunction, NASA could allow a launch with three out of the four ECO sensors operational.

Attempt	Planned	Result	Turnaround	Reason	Decision point	Weather go (%)	Notes
1	8 Sep 2006, 11:40:37 am	Scrubbed	—	Technical	8 Sep 2006, 10:52 am (T−9:00 hold)	70	Engine cut-off (ECO) sensor failure.
2	9 Sep 2006, 11:14:55 am	Success	0 days 23 hours 34 minutes			80	

=== September 9 (Flight day 1, Launch) ===
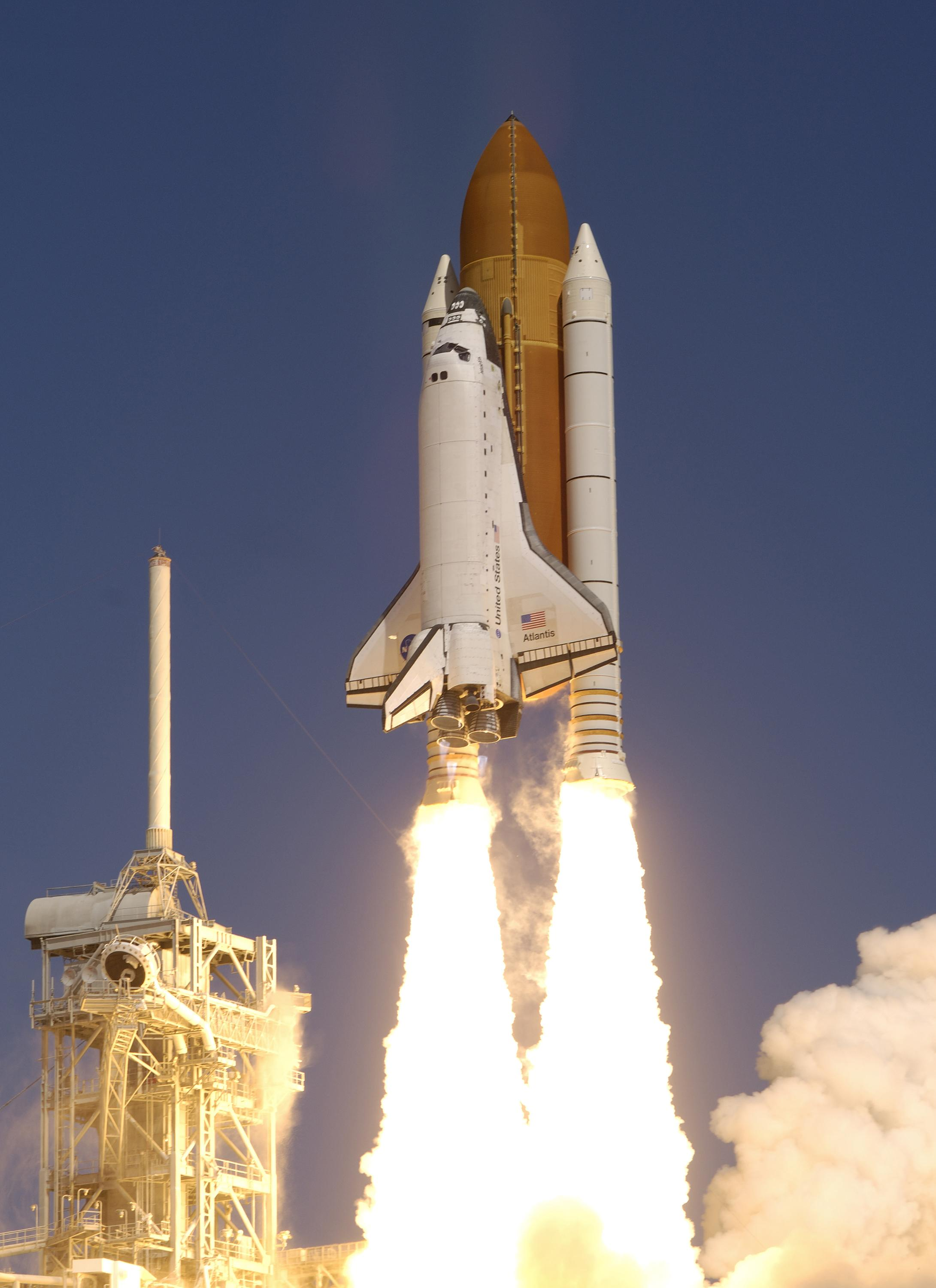
Space Shuttle Atlantis launches mission STS-115.

On September 9, 2006, all the engine cut-off sensors were working properly, and following a flawless countdown, at 15:15 UTC (11:15 EDT), Atlantis lifted off the launch pad to the International Space Station. As Atlantis launched, the International Space Station was 350 kilometres (220 mi; 190 nmi) above the northern Atlantic Ocean, between Greenland and Iceland.

During the climb to orbit, Mission Control asked the crew to reconfigure a cooling system that apparently had ice build up. The reconfiguration cleared the system, called the Flash Evaporator System, and it operated normally. Temporary ice in that cooling unit is not uncommon and has occurred on previous missions.

Moments after main engine cutoff, 8.5 minutes after liftoff, Tanner and MacLean used hand-held video and digital still cameras to document the external tank after it separated from the shuttle. That imagery, as well as imagery gathered by cameras in the shuttle's umbilical well where the tank was connected, was transmitted to the ground for review.

=== September 10 (Flight day 2) ===
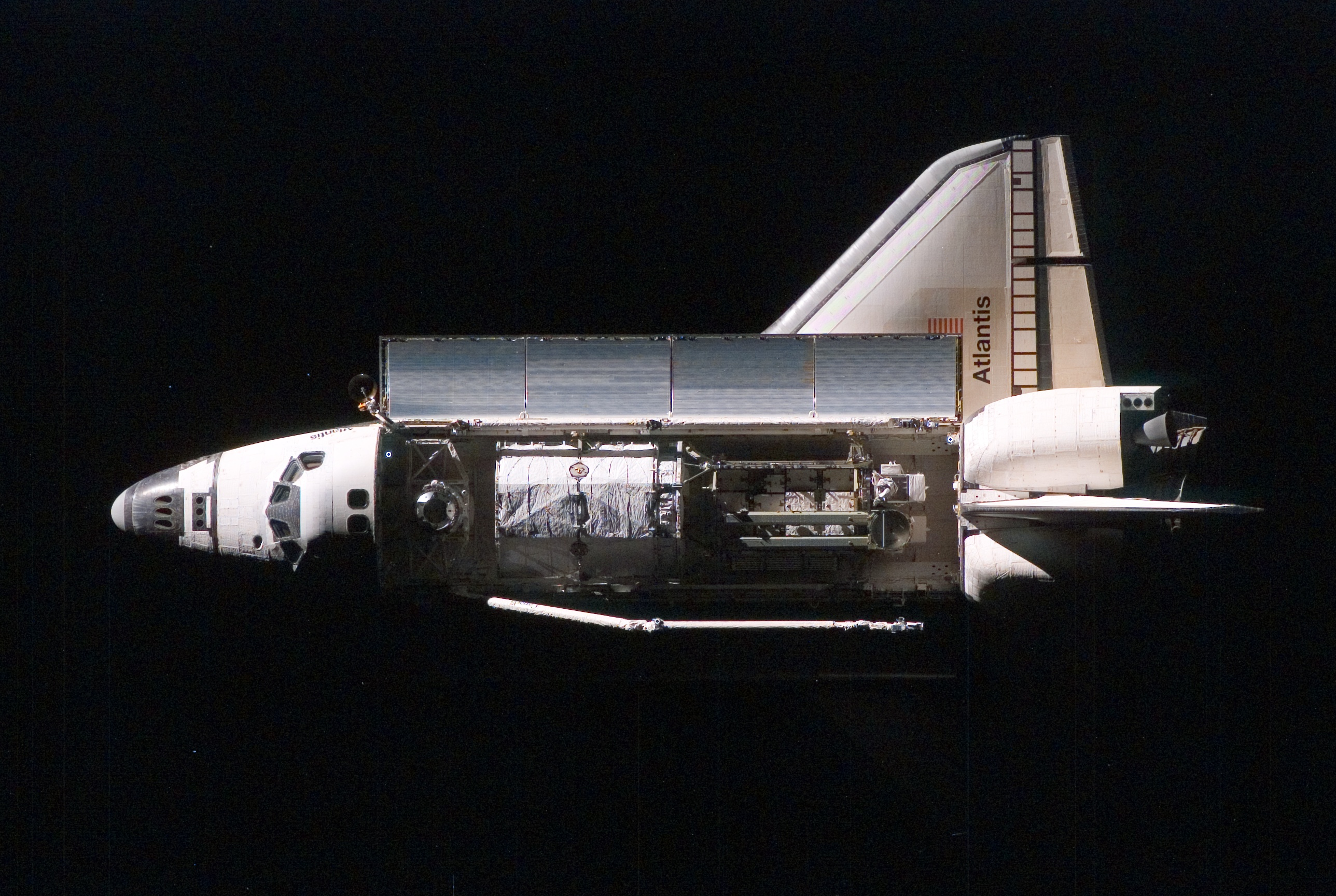
Atlantis approaching the ISS with the P3/P4 truss segment and solar arrays in the payload bay.

During their first full day in space, the crew thoroughly examined Atlantis with the Orbiter Boom Sensor System, the 15 meter (50-foot) long extension for the shuttle's robotic arm. Pilot Chris Ferguson and mission specialists Dan Burbank and Steve MacLean performed a slow, steady inspection of the reinforced carbon-carbon panels along the leading edge of Atlantis' starboard and port wings and the nose cap.

The crew worked ahead of schedule for most of the day readying the ship for docking and preparing for the mission's three planned extra-vehicular activities (EVA). Mission specialists Joe Tanner and Heide Stefanyshyn-Piper checked out the spacesuits and tools that they, Burbank and MacLean used during spacewalks set for Days 4, 5, and 7. The spacewalks installed the girder-like P3/P4 truss, deploy new solar arrays, and prepare them for operation.

On the space station, Expedition 13 Flight Engineer Jeffrey Williams prepared the orbiting laboratory for Atlantis' arrival on Day 3. He readied the digital cameras that was used to take high-resolution photos of the shuttle's heat shield. With help from Commander Pavel Vinogradov, Williams pressurized the Pressurized Mating Adapter 2 at the end of the Destiny Laboratory Module, where Atlantis later docked. Vinogradov also prepacked equipment to be returned.

=== September 11 (Flight day 3) ===
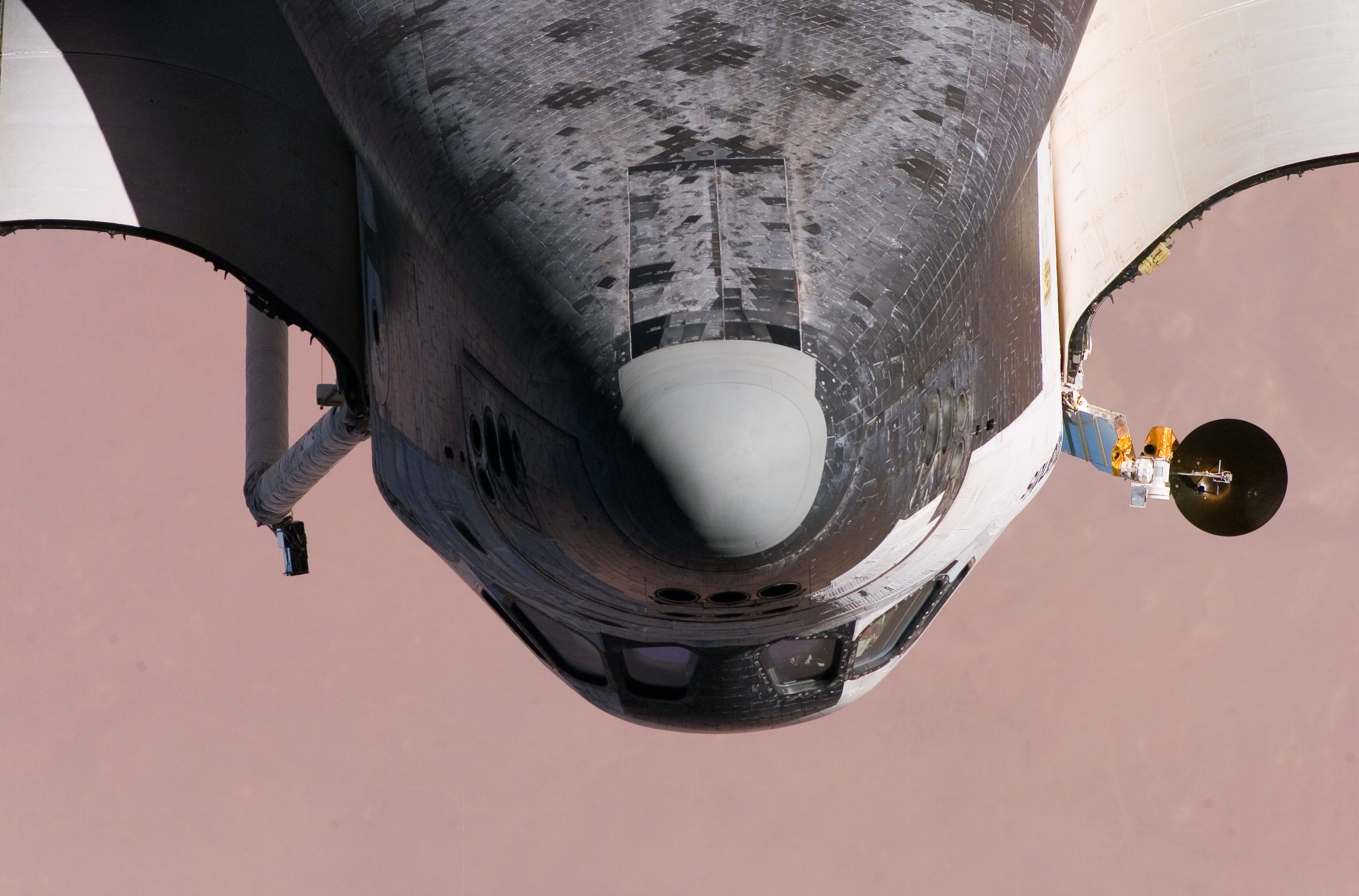
The nose and heat shield of Atlantis during an inspection, taken on Day 3 from the International Space Station

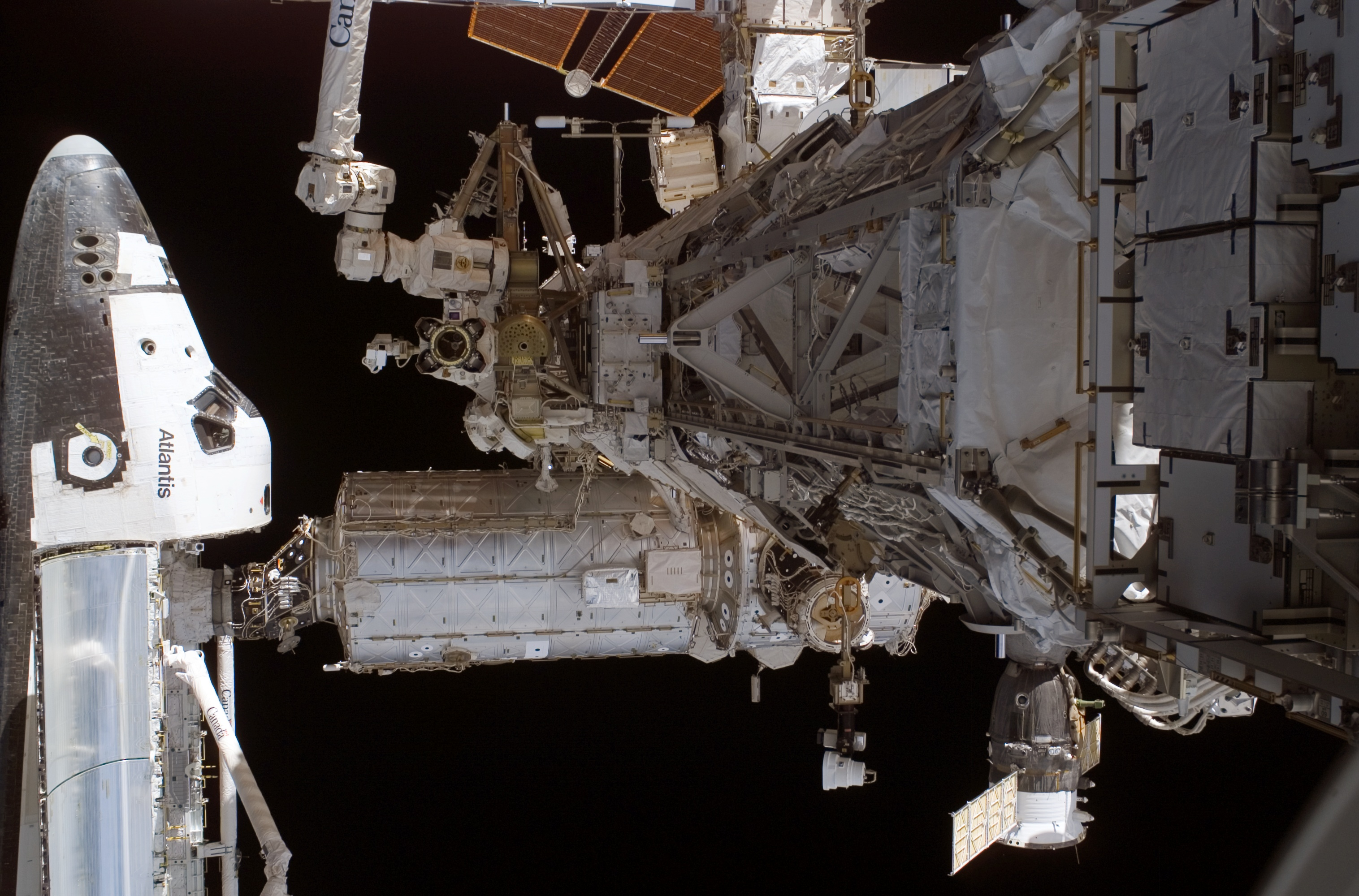
Atlantis docked to the ISS as seen during EVA 1 on Day 4.

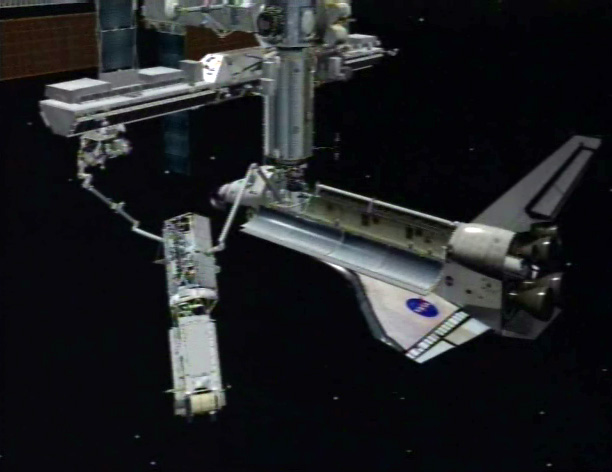
Atlantis's Canadarm hands the P3/P4 Truss segment to the station's Canadarm2 on Day 3 (a frame of an animation)

Prior to docking, Jett flew Atlantis through an orbital back flip while stationed about 180 meters (600 feet) below the space station. The maneuver allowed the Expedition 13 crew to take a series of high-resolution photographs of the orbiter's heat shield.

At about 10:46 UTC Atlantis docked with the International Space Station, and almost two hours later the hatch between them was opened, and the crew was welcomed aboard the station at 12:35 UTC.

Following docking, Ferguson and Burbank attached the shuttle's robotic Canadarm to the 17.5-ton P3/P4 truss, lifted it from its berth in the payload bay, and maneuvered it for handover to the station's Canadarm2.

After hatch opening, MacLean and Expedition 13 Flight Engineer Jeff Williams then used the Canadarm2 to take the truss from the shuttle's robotic arm. MacLean is the first Canadian to operate the Canadarm2 in space.

Tanner and Stefanyshyn-Piper began the "camping out" preparations in the Quest Airlock to prepare for a Day 4 spacewalk. The preparations are new pre-breathing measures on the part of NASA, to avoid decompression sickness, or the bends, by getting rid of some nitrogen in their bloodstreams. The preparations involve wearing oxygen masks and sleeping overnight in the airlock with the airlock at under 69 kPa (10 psi), to acclimate their bodies the low pressures they will encounter when wearing their spacesuits.

=== September 12 (Flight day 4) ===
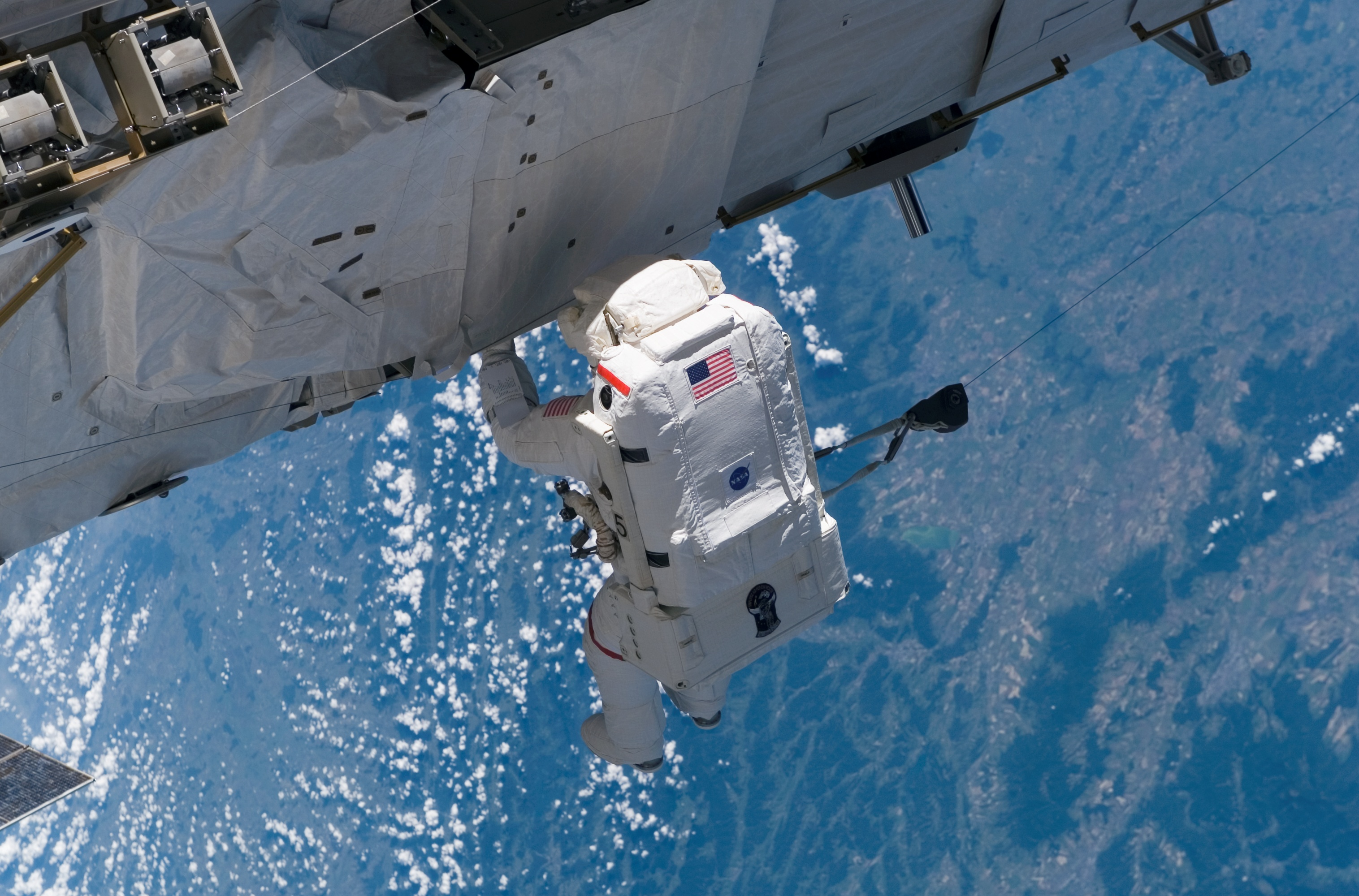
Joseph Tanner installing the P3/P4 Truss on Day 4's extra-vehicular activity

Following the installation of the P3/P4 Truss to the ISS by the Canadarm2, Tanner and Stefanyshyn-Piper began their spacewalk to activate the truss at 09:17 UTC. During the EVA they installed power and data cables between the P1 & P3/P4 trusses, released the P3/P4 truss' launch restraints and a number of other tasks to configure the truss for upcoming activities. The spacewalk was so successful that the astronauts carried out a number of tasks scheduled for later EVAs, with the eventual completion of the EVA at 15:43 UTC. A bolt, spring and washer assembly from a launch lock was lost during these extra activities and floated off into space.

Following the completion of the EVA, the station's crew began preparing for Day 5's spacewalk, with astronauts Burbank and MacLean entering the Quest Airlock for their "camp out" at 18:40 UTC, ready for the scheduled 09:15 UTC EVA.

=== September 13 (Flight day 5) ===
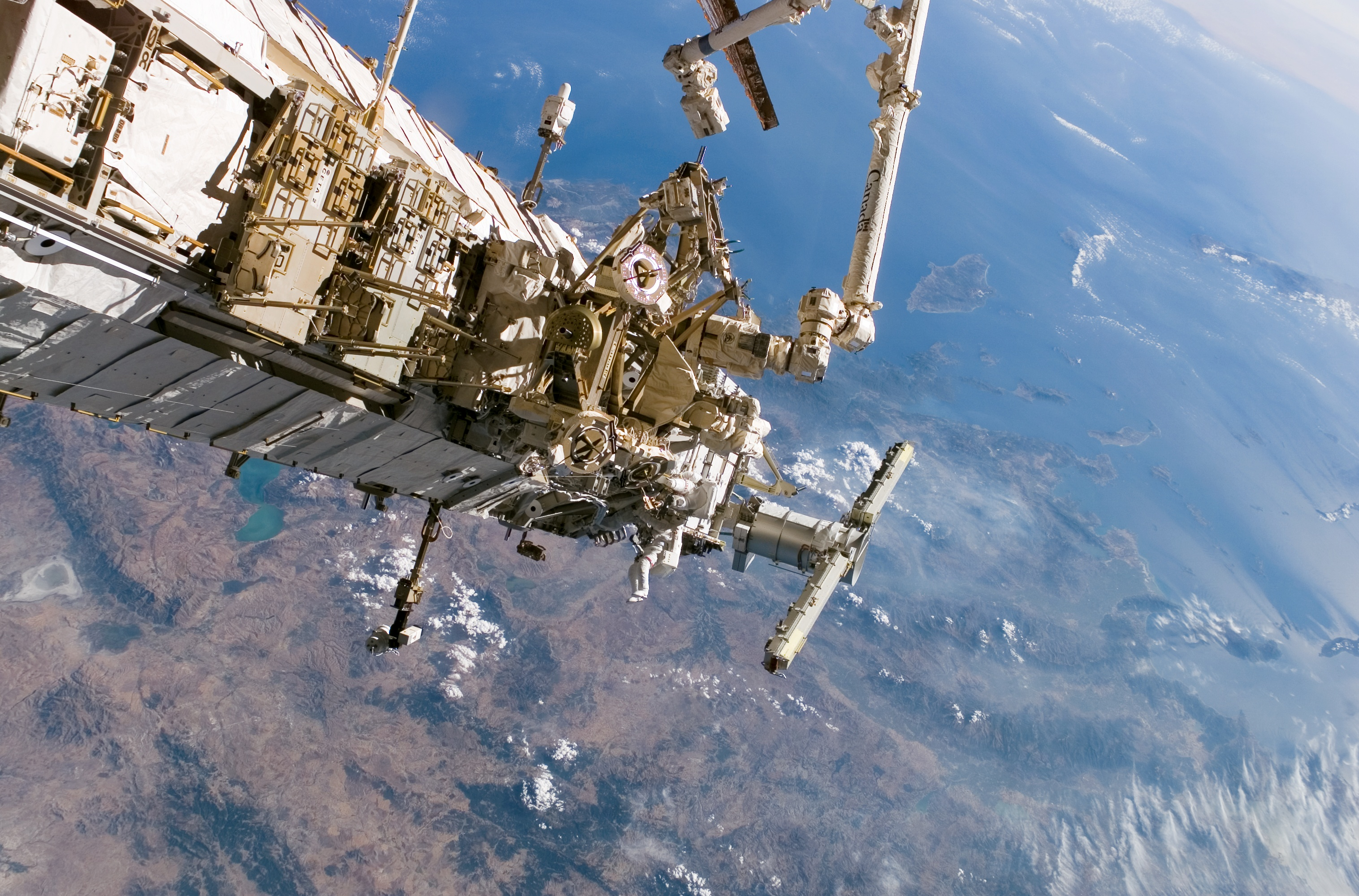
The new P3/P4 truss during EVA 2. Also, the new undeployed solar arrays can be seen on the bottom right

On Day 5, the second spacewalk of the mission was conducted, this time by first-time spacewalkers Burbank and MacLean. They devoted the day to the final tasks required for activation of the Solar Alpha Rotary Joint (SARJ). The SARJ is an automobile-sized joint that will allow the station's solar arrays to turn and point toward the sun. Burbank and MacLean released locks that had held the joint secure during its launch to orbit aboard Atlantis. As they worked, the spacewalkers overcame several minor problems, including a malfunctioning helmet camera, a broken socket tool, a stubborn bolt, and a bolt that came loose from the mechanism designed to hold it captive. The stubborn bolt required the force of both spacewalkers to finally remove it.

Burbank and MacLean spent 7 hours and 11 minutes outside the station, beginning their spacewalk at 09:05 UTC and completing it at 16:16 UTC. In addition to the SARJ work, they completed several "get-ahead" tasks during their time outside.

Engineers encountered a glitch during the four-hour activation and checkout of SARJ, and had temporarily delayed starting the deployment of the new solar arrays pending further work and checkout of the SARJ. The timeline allowed ample time to continue working on the problem during the night and still complete the deploy of the arrays on Thursday as scheduled.

=== September 14 (Flight day 6) ===
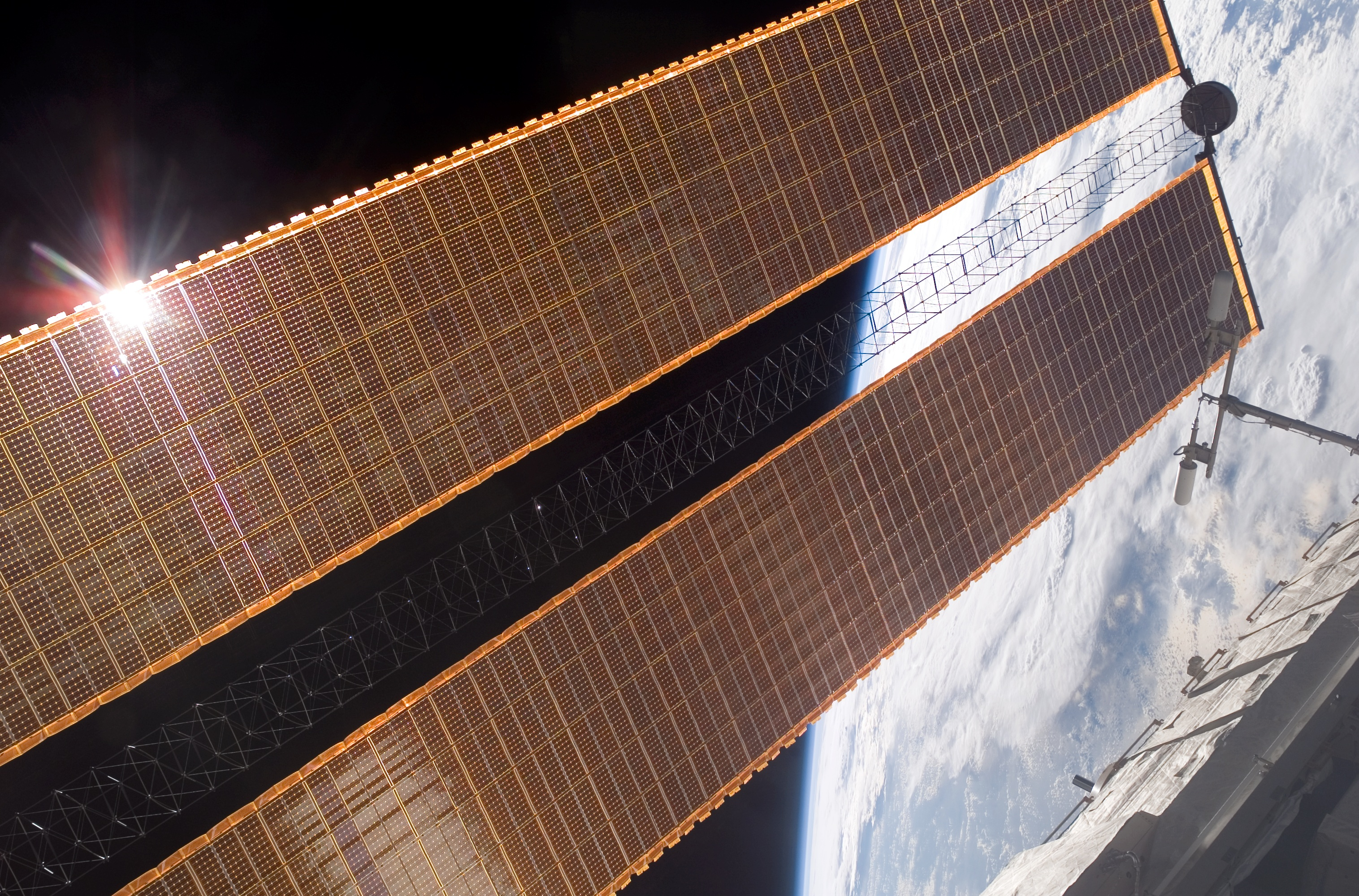
A solar array on the P4 truss fully deployed on Day 6

Day 6 continued the installation of the solar array. The unfurling of the solar panels themselves began a little behind schedule due to the problem encountered on Day 5 with SARJ. This problem was determined to be in the software, and a workaround was developed. The unfurling of the panels continued throughout the morning in stages to prevent the panels sticking, as they did during STS-97. It was noted by the crew that some panels were still sticking together, but this didn't cause any problems. Although the installation has been completed, the solar arrays will not provide power to the station until the next shuttle mission, STS-116, scheduled for December 2006, when the station will undergo a major electrical system rewiring.

Other activities of Day 6 included a "double walk off" of the station's Canadarm2 from its current location at the Mobile Base System to the Destiny Laboratory Module and the preparation for the mission's third spacewalk. A number of interviews were also conducted later in the day, between Jett & MacLean and Canadian Prime Minister Stephen Harper & students.

=== September 15 (Flight day 7) ===
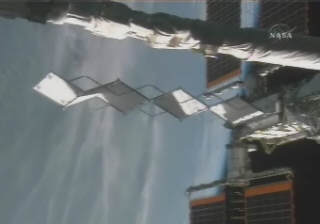
A radiator on the P4 Truss after unfolding on Day 7

Flight day 7 featured the third and final spacewalk of mission STS-115. The start of the spacewalk was delayed after a circuit-breaker-like remote power controller (RPC) tripped, causing loss of power to the airlock's depressurization pump. This was attributed to a momentary spike in the electric current of the depressurization pump. After assessing data to ensure the system had no short circuit, the breaker was reset and pump reactivated. Joe Tanner and Heide Stefanyshyn-Piper began their spacewalk at 10:00 UTC after a 45-minute delay

During the 6-hour and 42-minute spacewalk, the astronauts carried out numerous maintenance and repair tasks including removal of hardware used to secure the P3/P4 radiator during launch. Ground Flight Controllers subsequently unfurled the radiator, increasing the ability of the station to dissipate heat into space. Also, completed during this spacewalk was the retrieval of a materials exposure experiment from the outside of the ISS, maintenance on the P6 truss, installation of a wireless TV aerial and the replacement of the S1 truss' S-band antenna assembly.

A number of "get-ahead" tasks previously scheduled for future missions were also performed during this spacewalk. Near the end of the spacewalk, the astronauts carried out a test to evaluate using infrared video of the leading edge of Atlantis' wing to detect debris damage.

After the spacewalk, the station's mobile transporter was moved to a worksite on the P3 truss to inspect portions of that truss.

=== September 16 (Flight day 8) ===
Day 8 of STS-115, the last full day with Space Shuttle Atlantis docked to the ISS, was mainly spent in preparation for the undocking procedures to occur in flight day 9. The crew spent the morning resting following their highly successful mission, and then began getting ready for the undocking by carrying out transfers of ISS equipment and science experiments onto Atlantis ready for the trip home.

The crews of Expedition 13 and STS-115 also took part in the traditional joint-crew news conference, with mission Commander Brent Jett commenting on the success of the mission and on the construction missions to follow:

"All of the rest of the assembly missions are going to be challenging. We have similar payloads flying in the future. We are off to a good start on assembly. I think we can pass along a lot of the lessons to the future crews."

=== September 17 (Flight day 9) ===
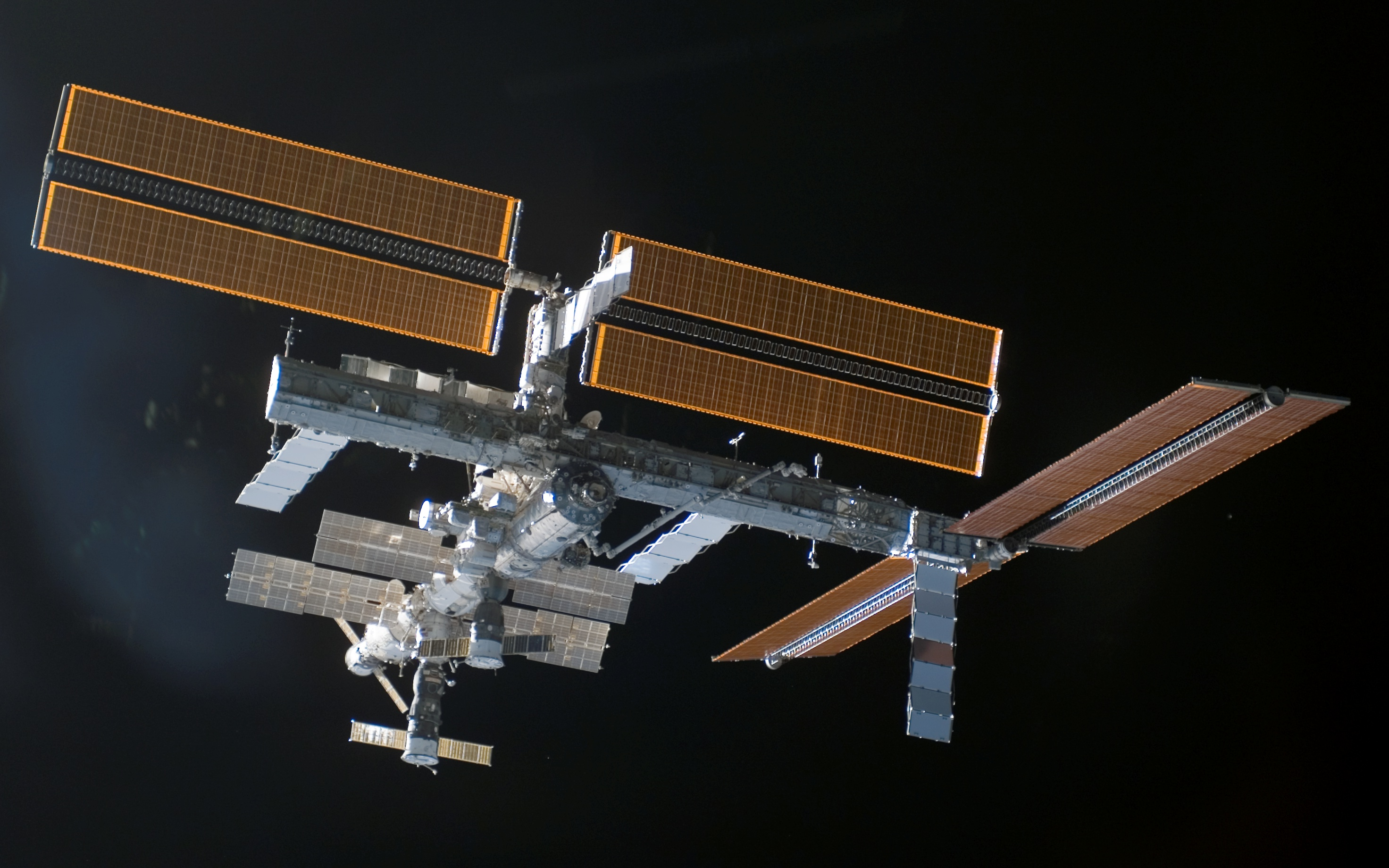
New configuration of the ISS, taken on Day 9 after undocking

Flight day 9 saw the end of STS-115's tasks at the ISS as Atlantis undocked from the International Space Station at 12:50 UTC.

Following the traditional farewell ceremonies between Expedition 13 and STS-115, the hatch between Atlantis and the ISS was closed and locked at 10:27 UTC. Then, after a series of checks for leaks, Atlantis left the dock to begin its 360-degree flyaround of the expanded ISS to document the new configuration.

=== September 18 (Flight day 10) ===
The crew of STS-115 spent the morning of Flight Day 10 carrying out final inspections of Atlantis' heat shield in preparation for re-entry on flight day 12.

Orbiting around 80 kilometers (50 mi) behind the ISS, the crew used the Orbiter's robotic arm and boom sensor system to make sure that no damage had been done to Atlantis' nose and wing leading edges by micrometeoroids and other space junk. The crew spent the rest of this light duty day stowing equipment in preparation for re-entry and landing.

=== September 19 (Flight day 11) ===
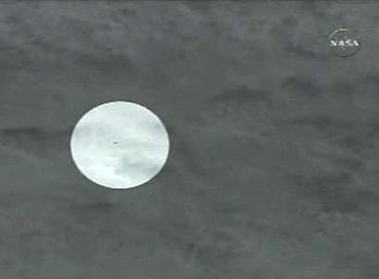
Image of the unknown flying object in its co-orbital path with Atlantis

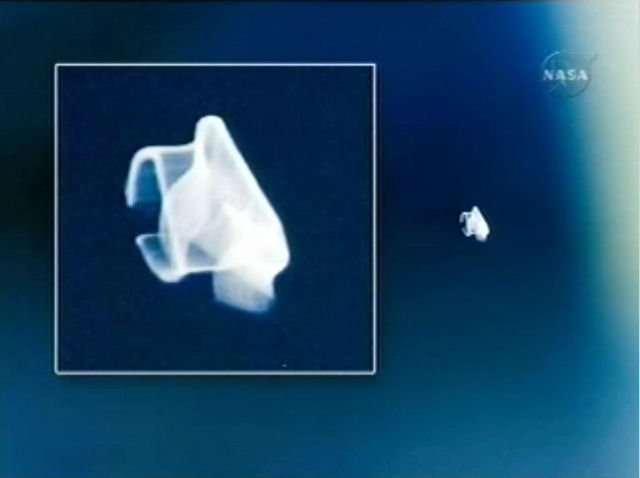
High-resolution image of a second unknown flying object

During the morning of day 11, astronauts Jett and Ferguson tested Atlantis' reaction control thrusters and practiced for landing using on-board computers. The thrusters will be used to position the shuttle during re-entry.

The crew also took some time for interviews, with Ferguson telling the media that everyone on board was looking forward to landing. "I think we all, thus far, feel pretty good about the job that we did," Ferguson said. "We are looking forward to a successful re-entry and landing sometime tomorrow."

Following the interviews, the crew continued their preparations for re-entry by stowing unnecessary equipment and other tasks prior to landing. However, the crew informed the Mission Control Center later in the day that, following the test of the reaction control system, an object was seen moving in a co-orbital path with the Orbiter. The astronauts spotted the object using an on-board TV camera, but unfortunately the resolution of the images was not high enough to identify the object.

The images were sent down to the MCC for further analysis by flight controllers, who were concerned about the possibility that the object may have come off Atlantis, and as such wished to identify the object. The most likely scenario was that the object was benign, such as ice or a piece of shimstock (observed earlier in the flight protruding from the heat shield) that may have shaken loose. However, the possibility remained that the object may be of critical importance, such as a tile from the Orbiter's thermal protection system, and the Mission Control Center asked Atlantis' crew to power up the shuttle's robotic arm ready to reinspect the orbiter, and drew up plans for a series of tests which took place on flight day 12 to determine whether the shuttle was safe for re-entry. This extra inspection, added to poor weather forecasts predicted for the Shuttle Landing Facility for Wednesday, and the de-orbit burn and landing were delayed by a day.

=== September 20 (Flight day 12) ===
Following the discovery of a co-orbiting object on flight day 11, Flight Controllers spent the early hours of the morning using the Orbiter's robotic arm to inspect the upper surface of Atlantis, with the astronauts on board the Orbiter spending the rest of the morning scanning the underside of the shuttle for any areas of concern. Following these scans, the crew received word from the Mission Control Center in Houston to use the orbiter boom sensor system to conduct more inspections of Atlantis' heat shield.

Following the review of these scans, together with an overnight analysis of the payload bay by Ground Flight Controllers, it was determined that there remained no safety issue with Atlantis, and Mission Controllers cleared the Orbiter for re-entry. This clean bill of health, added to a favorable weather forecast for the Shuttle Landing Facility for Thursday morning, permitted Atlantis to be cleared for a landing the next day.

The crew spent the remainder of the day in preparation for landing, packing up gear and stowing the Ku band antenna used for TV broadcasts. During the inspection, the crew was notified that the Soyuz TMA-9 spacecraft was docked with the ISS above, which carried the first half of the Expedition 14 crew.

=== September 21 (Flight day 13 and landing) ===
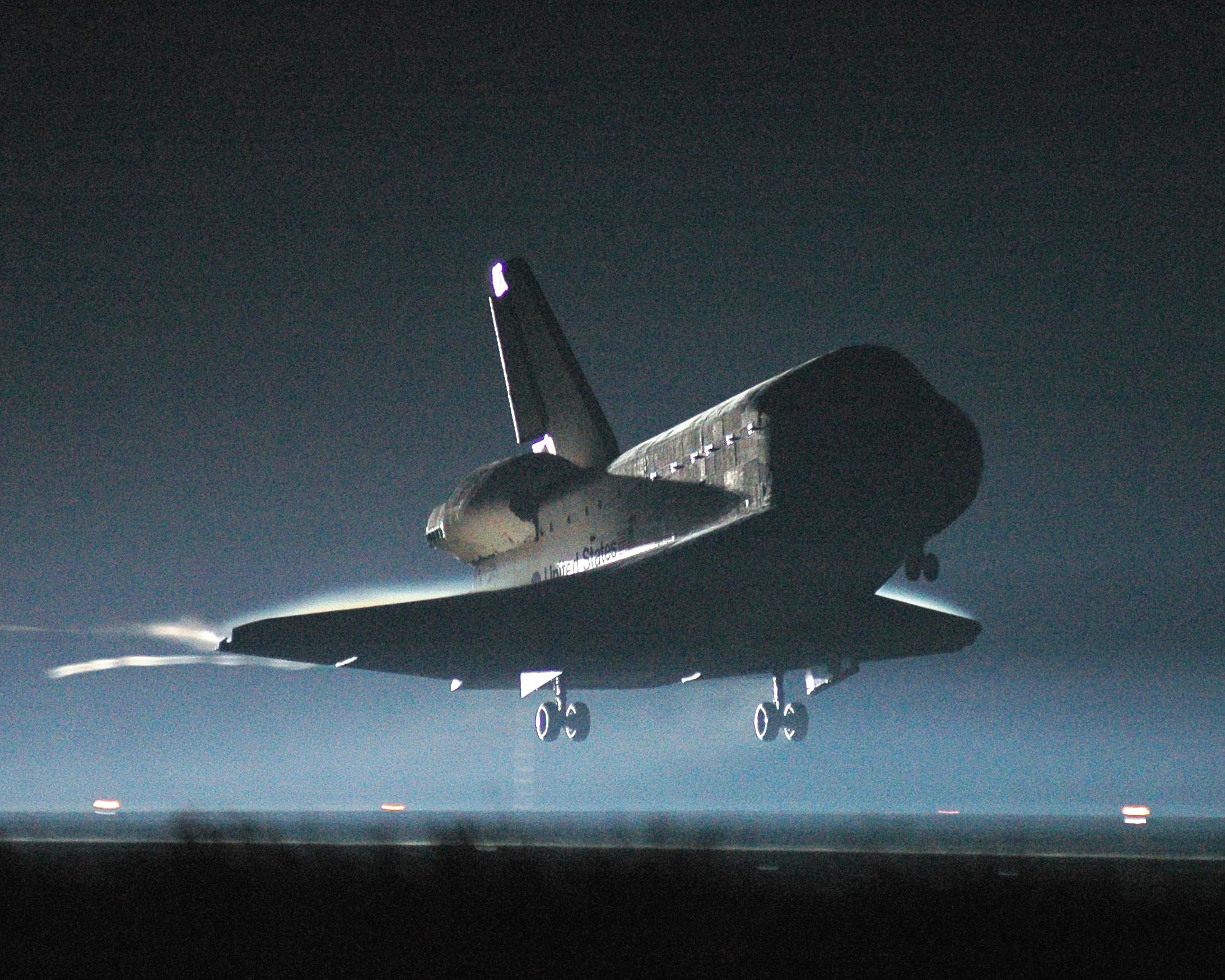
Concluding mission STS-115, Atlantis and her crew return to Kennedy Space Center and approach a landing before sunrise on Runway 33.

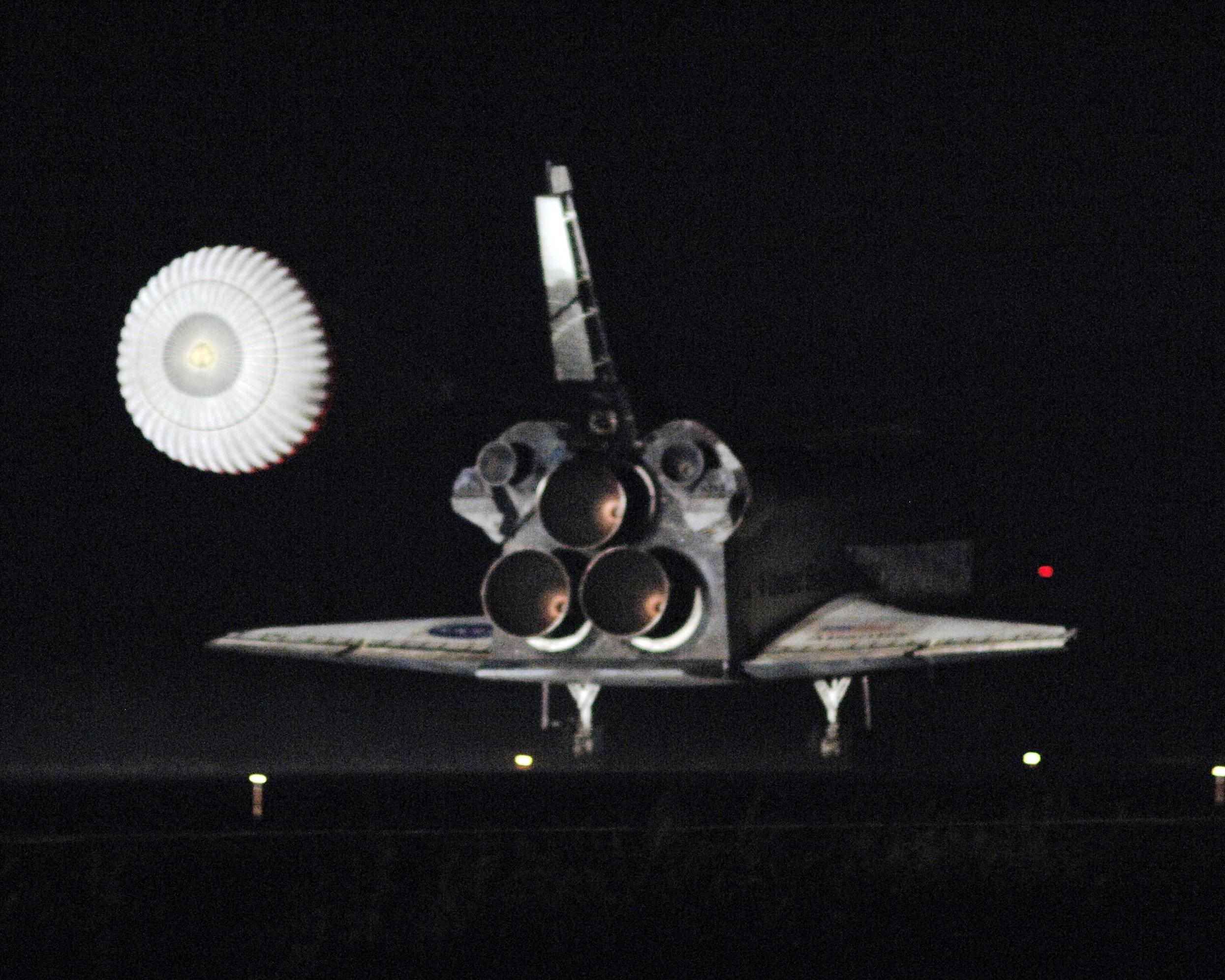
The drag chute glows in the lights illuminating Atlantis as it touches down on Runway 33.

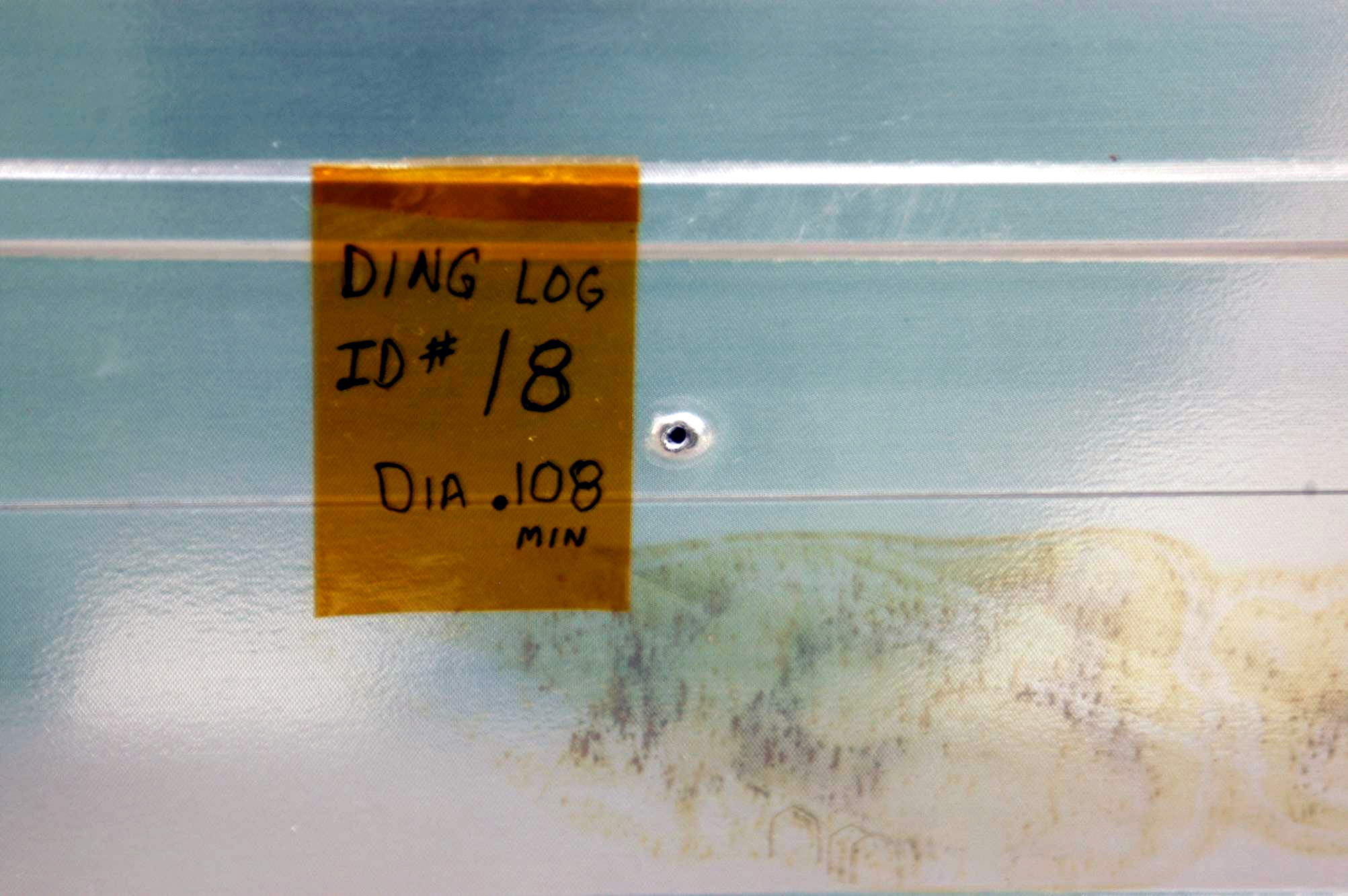
Damage caused by micrometeoroid impact. (NASA)

Flight day 13 was the last day of the mission, with the final re-entry procedures and landing taking place during the morning, and numerous debriefs and conferences in the afternoon. The landing process began hours before the actual landing at Kennedy Space Center. The process began with the APU prestart at 04:37 EDT, followed by the closing of the payload bay doors and sealing of the Orbiter at 04:45 EDT. Atlantis' crew received the final "Go" for the prime re-entry window from Mission Control in Houston at 04:52 EDT. The crew then started the deorbit reorientation of the shuttle so that its engines faced in its direction of travel, meaning that by firing the engines for the deorbit burn Atlantis would slow down and begin its descent out of orbit.

The de-orbit burn was initiated at 05:15 EDT, lasting 2 minutes 40 seconds with two engines burning well throughout. The astronauts aboard the Orbiter were informed at 05:17 EDT that their burn was perfect, with no alterations required as Atlantis began her drop through the atmosphere above the Indian Ocean.

Following the deorbit burn, the crew of Atlantis began dumping excess propellant overboard, a process lasting 3 minutes, concluding at 05:26 EDT, with the Orbiter 55 minutes away from landing. Twenty-five minutes later, at 05:51 EDT, Atlantis began feeling the effects of the atmosphere at an altitude of approximately 130 kilometres (81 mi), and soon after began its "roll reversal banking" in order to bleed off most of the 27,000 kilometres per hour (17,000 mph) she was traveling at, ready for landing at less than 760 kilometres per hour (470 mph). The ISS was positioned in such a way as to be above the reentry path taken by Atlantis, so the astronauts were able to observe the entire maneuver from above.

At 06:08 EDT, the downlink from the Shuttle was acquired by the MILA tracking station on Merritt Island, Florida, with GPS data beginning to be accepted by the Orbiter three minutes later. Ten minutes following the first detection of Atlantis, two sonic booms were heard at Kennedy Space Center as the Orbiter dropped below the sound barrier three minutes prior to touchdown. Commander Jett took control of Atlantis a minute later, and, with Kennedy Space Center Runway 33 in sight, began bringing his ship in for a landing.

Atlantis' main gear touched down at 06:21:30 EDT on Runway 33 at the Space Shuttle Landing Facility at Kennedy Space Center, with the nose gear following 6 seconds later at 06:21:36 EDT, and, 8,000,000 kilometres (5,000,000 mi) after launch, the Orbiter's wheels came to a stop at 06:22:16 EDT, bringing mission STS-115 to an end.

The morning's landing was considered a night landing as it took place about 48 minutes before sunrise, and as such was the 21st night landing for the Space Shuttle Program. It was the 63rd landing at Kennedy Space Center, as well as the 27th mission for Atlantis.

== Post flight ==
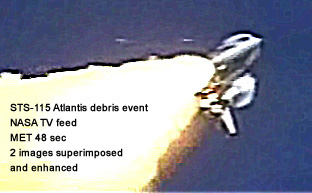
STS-115 MET 48 seconds Launch Debris Event

While working on the Atlantis orbiter, NASA technicians discovered that one of the spacecraft's radiator panels showed evidence of micrometeorite damage. A hole was observed which was reported to be about 2.7 mm (0.108 in) in diameter.

== Debris analysis ==
NASA's Mission Management Team conducted a detailed analysis of data from many sources including ground imagery, radar, shuttle inspections using the Canadarm and from the space station. By Day 2 they pinpointed a handful of launch debris events, and drew a preliminary conclusion that the effect was minimal. Later that day, NASA agency engineers decided that additional heat shield inspections were not required. The preceding only relates to debris shed immediately during or after launch, and not the debris observed on September 19, 2006.

Not mentioned was a large debris event during launch at 48 seconds near max Q. Because it happened on the ET side opposite the Orbiter, it was never a danger to the Shuttle. By the origin from near the top of the ET, it presents a new source of debris and is therefore of concern for further missions.

== Wake-up calls ==
A tradition for NASA spaceflights since the days of Gemini, mission crews are played a special musical track at the start of each day in space. Each track is specially chosen, often by their family, and usually has special meaning to an individual member of the crew, or is applicable to their daily activities.

Flight Day	Song	Artist	Played for	Links
Day 2	"Moon River"	Audrey Hepburn	Brent Jett	wav mp3 Transcript
Day 3	"cello & double bass"	Daniel Burbank's children	Daniel Burbank	wav mp3 Transcript
Day 4	"My Friendly Epistle"	Taras Shevchenko	Heidemarie Stefanyshyn-Piper	wav mp3 Transcript
Day 5	"Takin' Care of Business"	Bachman–Turner Overdrive	Steve MacLean	wav mp3 Transcript
Day 6	"Wipe Out"	The Surfaris	Chris Ferguson	wav mp3 Transcript
Day 7	"Hotel California"	The Eagles	Joseph Tanner	wav mp3 Transcript
Day 8	"Twelve Volt Man"	Jimmy Buffett	Daniel Burbank	wav mp3 Transcript
Day 9	"Danger Zone"	Kenny Loggins	Chris Ferguson	wav mp3 Transcript
Day 10	"Rocky Mountain High"	John Denver	Joseph Tanner	wav mp3 Transcript
Day 11	"Ne Partez Pas Sans Moi"	Celine Dion	Steve MacLean	wav mp3 Transcript
Day 12	"Beautiful Day"	U2	Heidemarie Stefanyshyn-Piper	wav mp3 Transcript
Day 13	"WWOZ"	Better Than Ezra	Brent Jett	wav mp3 Transcript

== Contingency mission ==
STS-300 was the designation given to the Contingency Shuttle Crew Support mission which would have launched in the event Space Shuttle Discovery became disabled during STS-114 or STS-121. This rescue mission would have been a modified version of the STS-115 mission with the launch date being brought forward and the crew reduced.
STS-300 would have launched no earlier than August 17, 2006, and the crew for STS-300 would have been a four-person subset of the full STS-115 crew:

- Brent Jett, commander
- Christopher Ferguson, pilot and backup Remote Manipulator System (RMS) operator
- Joseph Tanner, mission specialist 1, Extravehicular 1 and prime RMS operator
- Daniel Burbank, mission specialist 2 and Extravehicular 2

== Media ==
The components and the unfolding of the P3/P4 Truss in Detail (Animation).

Space Shuttle Atlantis launches from launch pad 39B at Kennedy Space Center as part of the STS-115 mission.

== See also ==
- Outline of space science
- 2006 in spaceflight
- List of International Space Station spacewalks
- List of Space Shuttle missions
- Lists of spacewalks and moonwalks
- List of human spaceflights
