= Timex Datalink =

Early smartwatch

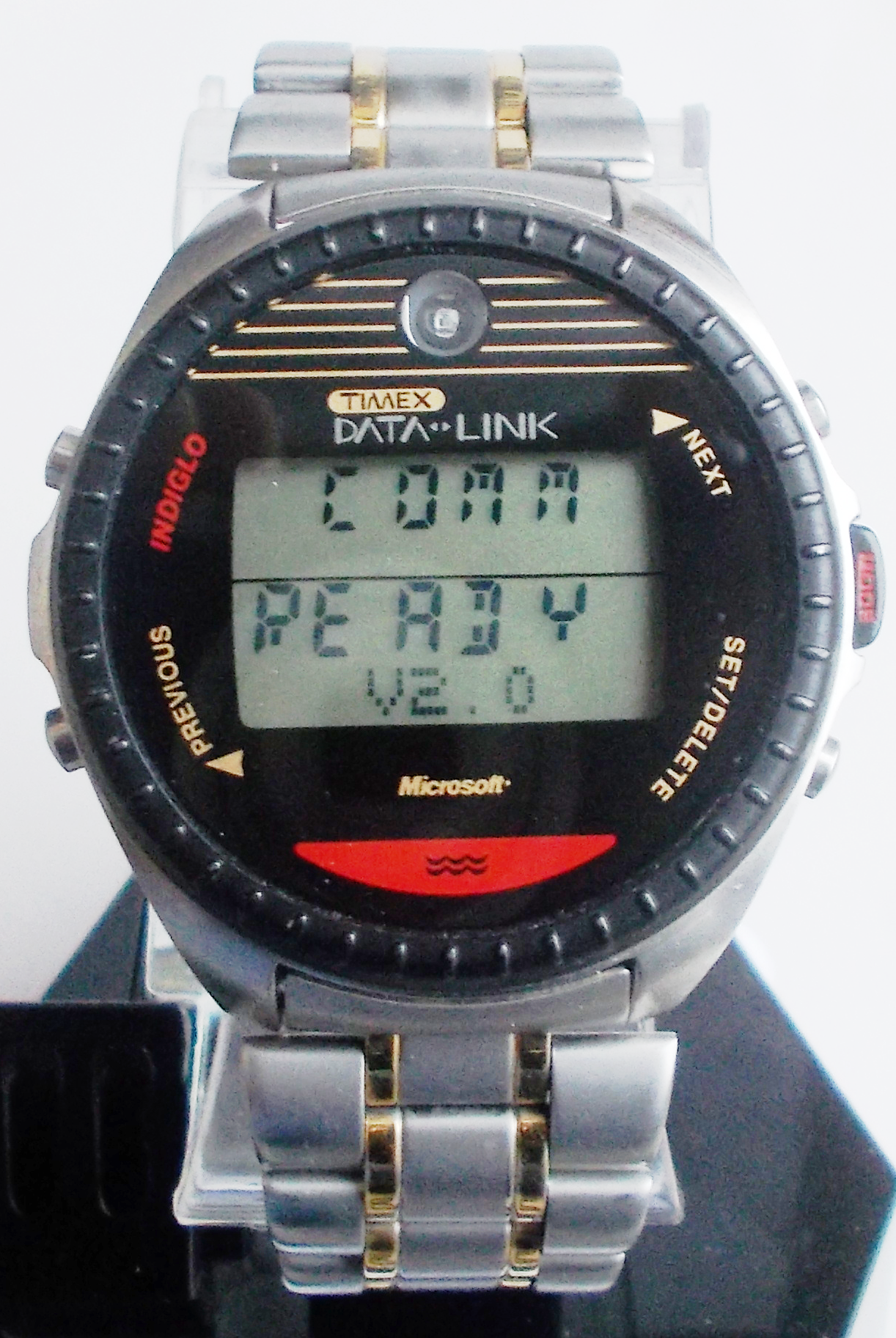
The model 150 with steel bracelet (model 69737) in PC-communication mode. The optical sensor is clearly visible at 12 o' clock on the face of the watch. The Microsoft logo is also visible. The wave pattern below the Microsoft logo indicates that the watch is water resistant. The leather strap version of the watch (model 69721) was worn by commander William Shepherd during Expedition 1 and cosmonaut Mikhail Tyurin, Expedition 14, on the ISS.

Timex Datalink or Timex Data Link is a line of early smartwatches manufactured by Timex and is considered a wristwatch computer. It is the first watch capable of downloading information wirelessly from a computer. As the name implies, datalink watches are capable of data transfer through linking with a computer. The Datalink line was introduced in 1994 and it was co-developed with Microsoft as a wearable alternative to mainstream PDAs with additional attributes such as water resistance, that PDAs lacked, and easy programmability. The watch was demonstrated by Bill Gates on 21 June 1994 in a presentation where he downloaded information from a computer monitor using bars of light and then showed to the audience the downloaded appointments and other data. The early models included models 50, 70, 150 and model 150s (small size). The model numbers indicated the approximate number of phone numbers that could be stored in the watch memory. These early models were, at the time of their introduction, the only watches to bear the Microsoft logo. The watches have been certified by NASA for space travel and have been used by astronauts and cosmonauts in space missions. There had been an evolution over the years as to the number and type of entries that can be stored in the various watch models as well as the mode of data transfer between computer and watch. At the time of its introduction the watch was considered high-tech.

There is also the Timex Beepwear Datalink series, featuring wearable pagers using the Timex datalink platform which also function as electronic organisers.

== Wireless data transfer mode ==
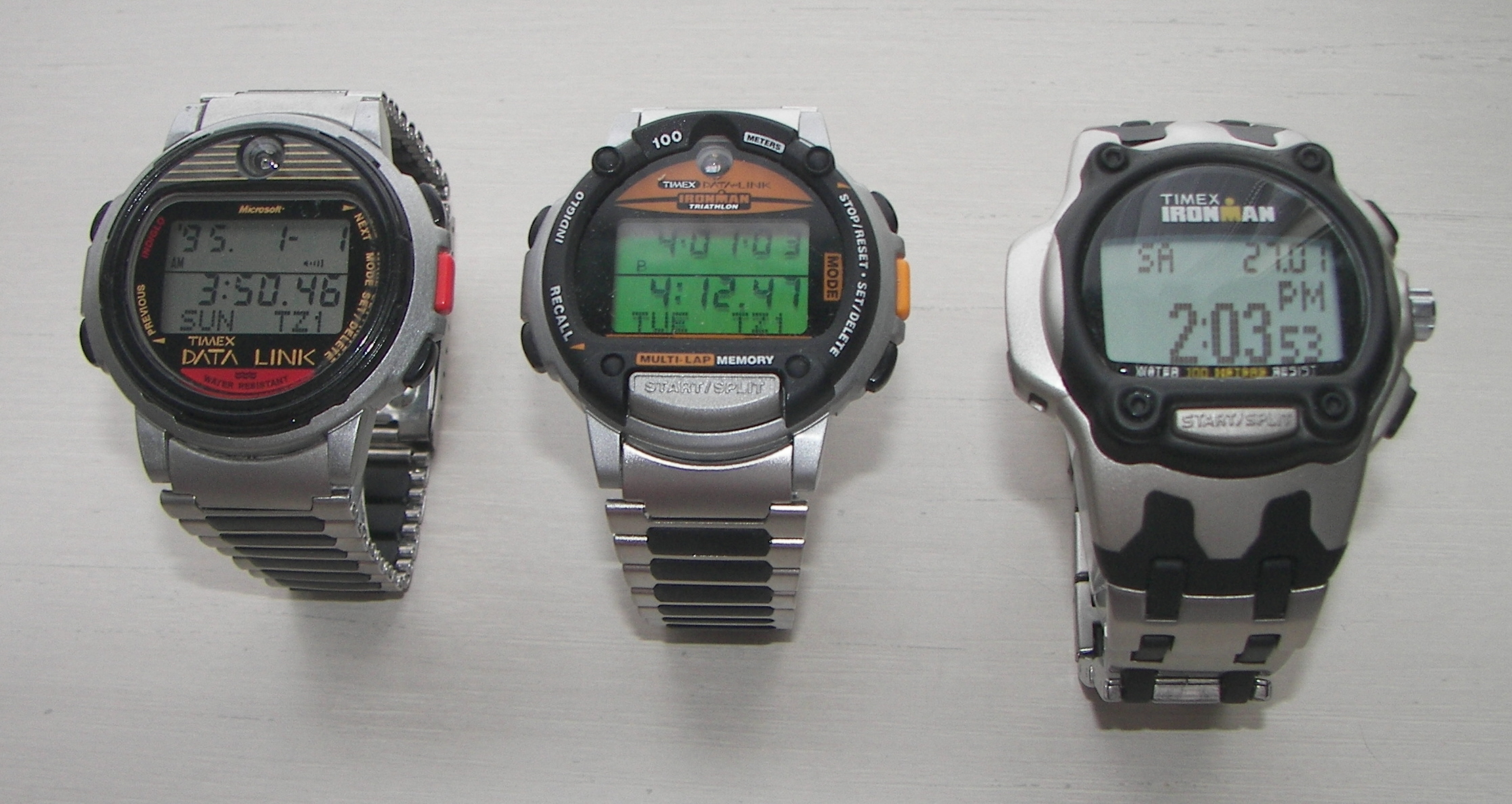
The evolution of the Datalink line shown with metal bands for easy comparison (left to right in order of chronological appearance): Datalink model 50 (1994), Ironman Triathlon, with the Ironman Triathlon logo on the upper part of the face (1997) and Datalink USB sports edition (2003). The small lens is seen on both model 50 and the Ironman. Note also the inverted circular arch digital display frame design on the model 50, compared to the frame design of the other two models. The Microsoft logo appears at the top, while the Datalink logo appears at the bottom for model 50. The lower button arrangement and platform is the same for both model 50 and Ironman triathlon, but Ironman sports an additional start/split button on its face, indicating its additional chronograph functions. All three models are water resistant to 100 m. The model 50 (Timex models 70502/70518) was worn by astronaut James H. Newman on STS-88.

Although there are other watches capable of storing all kinds of data, most had either a small keyboard or buttons, which could be used to input data. In most cases data was lost when the battery expired. Upon introduction of the Timex Datalink models, "data watches" such as those from Casio were noted as selling for "between a third and a half the price" of such models, but the "fiddly little buttons" (having to be pressed repeatedly to select letters from the alphabet) were regarded as less convenient and largely only appealing to those used to "doing things the hard way". The Datalink models also offered water resistance to a depth of 100 metres, Timex's Indiglo backlighting, and "the build quality that helped make Timex a household name", although this robustness was reported as making the product more like "the kind of "chunky, clunky watches that divers prefer", being around one-and-a-half inches in diameter and standing "over half an inch proud of the wrist".

The Timex Datalink watches downloaded data Wirelessly by illuminating a computer screen with a changing display encoding information to transfer, which was detected by the watch's sensor. Data to be transferred to Datalink watches was held in a database maintained by the Datalink software running on a Windows-based host computer, with alarms, appointments, anniversaries, phone numbers, reminders (or to-do items) being the supported categories of data for transfer. Textual labels for various categories could be up to 15 characters in length, with such text scrolling across an eight character display. Although the time could be set through normal use of the watch, the software also permitted the time to be updated using the transfer mechanism. Selecting the "Send to Watch" option in the Datalink software and pointing the watch face towards the screen at a distance of between six and twelve inches, guided by beeping sounds from the watch, resulted in the transfer of data at a rate that permitted around 1 KB or 70 entries to be sent in less than a minute. However, the mechanism required the use of a cathode-ray tube monitor, as opposed to a liquid-crystal or other kind of display. Transfer of data from the watch to the computer was also not permitted by this mechanism, but entries could be deleted on the watch or, in the case of to-do items, marked as done. When the watch's battery expired the data would be transferred again after replacement of the battery.

=== Optical sensor ===
The watch had a small lens at the top of its face used for data transmission by visible light. Data was transmitted from the CRT of the computer through a series of pulsating horizontal bars, that were focused by the lens and written to the watch EEPROM memory through an optoelectronic transducer operating in the visible light spectrum and employing optical scanning technology.

The original Timex Datalink software with CRT synchronization support is compatible with Windows versions Windows 3.1 to Windows XP. The watch was compatible with Microsoft's Schedule+ time management software. For the Datalink 70 model, the time needed to download seventy phone numbers was about twenty seconds.

==== Encoded message ====
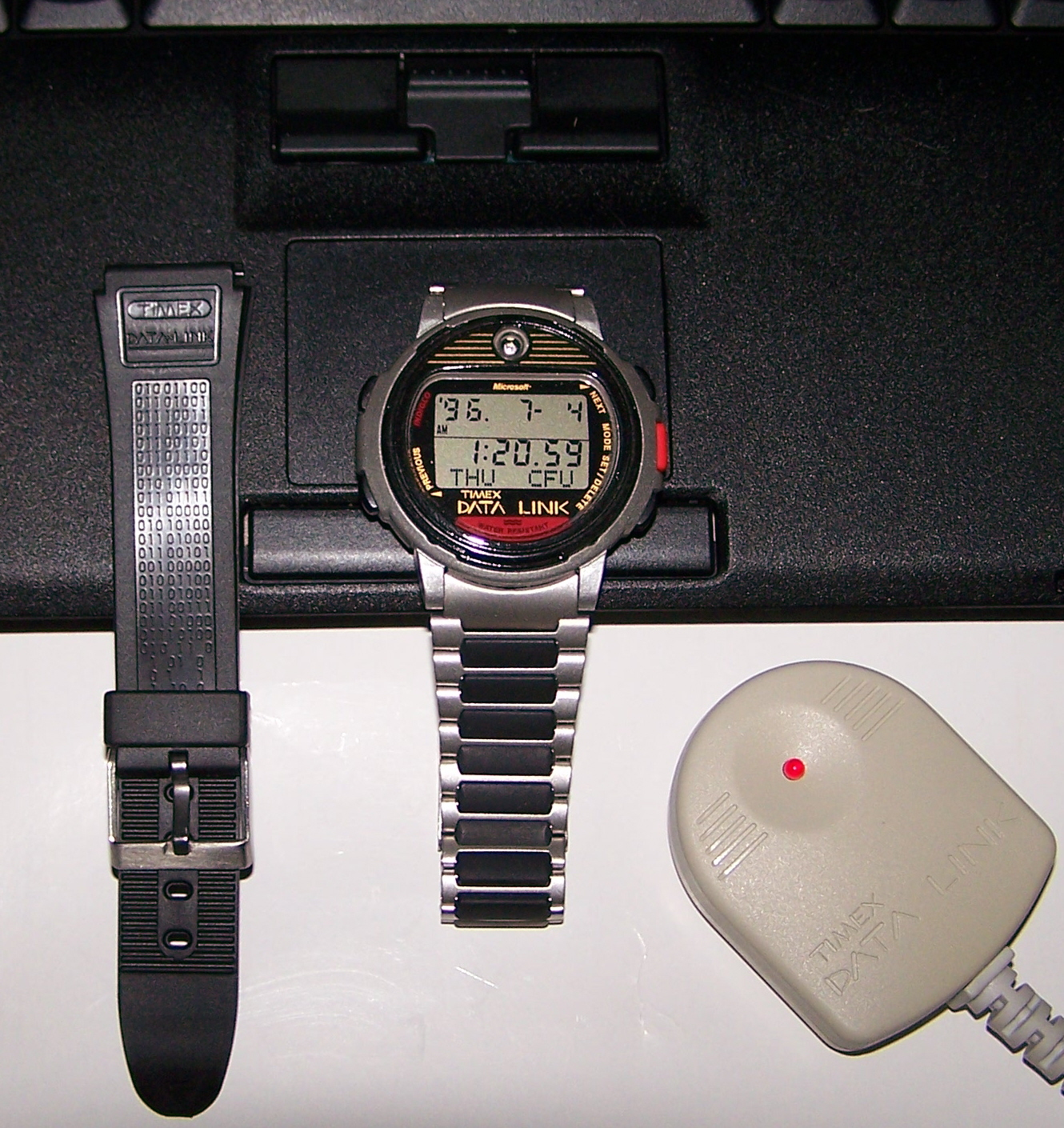
Timex Datalink 50 model 70518 and resin strap of model 70301 with binary ASCII code translating as: "Listen To The Light If You Can See"

On the resin strap of the Timex Datalink 50 model 70301, there is a print with binary numbers which are actually ASCII. The numbers on one half of the strap encode, including capitalization, the text 'Listen To The Light'. The numbers on other half of the strap encode the text 'If You [ASCII-24] See', which, given that ASCII-24 is the 'Cancel' character or just 'CAN', makes the complete message 'Listen To The Light If You Can See'.

== Earlier models of the Datalink series ==
The earlier models were the Datalink 50, Datalink 70, Datalink 150 and Datalink 150s, where the "s" was for small and it was intended to be a lady's watch. The 150 and 150s models are essentially the same, except that the 150s, having a smaller display, has different display addresses from the 150, and thus it needs its own programming code.

The programming code is provided in the Timex Datalink software v 2.1 for all models. These watches were programmed using the same software and computer GUI. To download the settings to these early models, the user was prompted to choose the relevant watch model number.

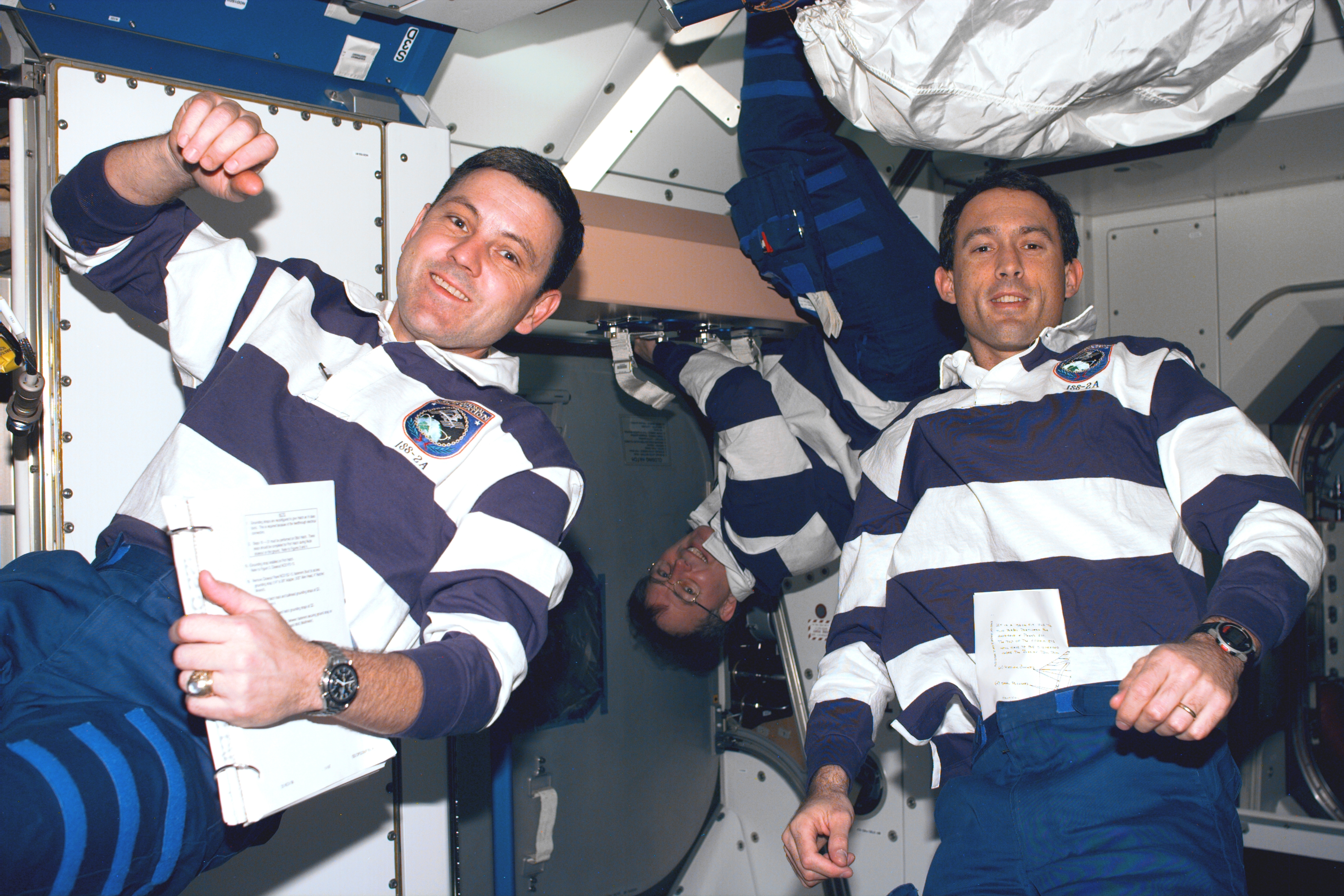
Astronaut James H. Newman (right) wears the Timex Datalink 50 model 70502 on STS-88

The menu choices were the same for all models. The only differences were the amount of available memory in the watches, and the quantity of phone numbers, appointments, lists etc. which could be downloaded to each model.

At the time of their introduction, these watches were known as "PIM" watches, i.e. personal information managers. Bill Gates was known as an owner of one, and had also shown the capabilities of the watch on television. The Datalink 150 was also offered as a mail-in gift upon purchase of Office 95.

The model number indicated the maximum number of phone numbers that could be downloaded to the watch. For example, the model 150 could store a maximum of 150 phone numbers if nothing else was stored. Available storage was shared by phone numbers, appointments, anniversaries, lists, wristapps and watch sounds. These models lacked countdown timers or chronographs, but a simple chronograph could be added as an external application also known as a wristapp. The wristapps also included a notepad capable of storing forty words.

=== Digital display and time zones ===
The time and date parts of the digital display of the Datalink watches consisted of two main rows of seven segment displays, while the lower portion was a dot matrix display with scrolling capabilities. In time display mode, the dot matrix portion of the display showed the day of the week to the left, and the time zone to the right. The default time zone was indicated as TZ1 (time zone 1), and was fully user customizable to designate any city in the world, usually using IATA naming conventions. The earlier Datalink models featured dual time zone settings. The secondary time zone had the option to become the local (primary) time by pressing and holding a button until the changeover was effected. All Datalink models had the Indiglo night light.

== Ironman Triathlon Datalink ==
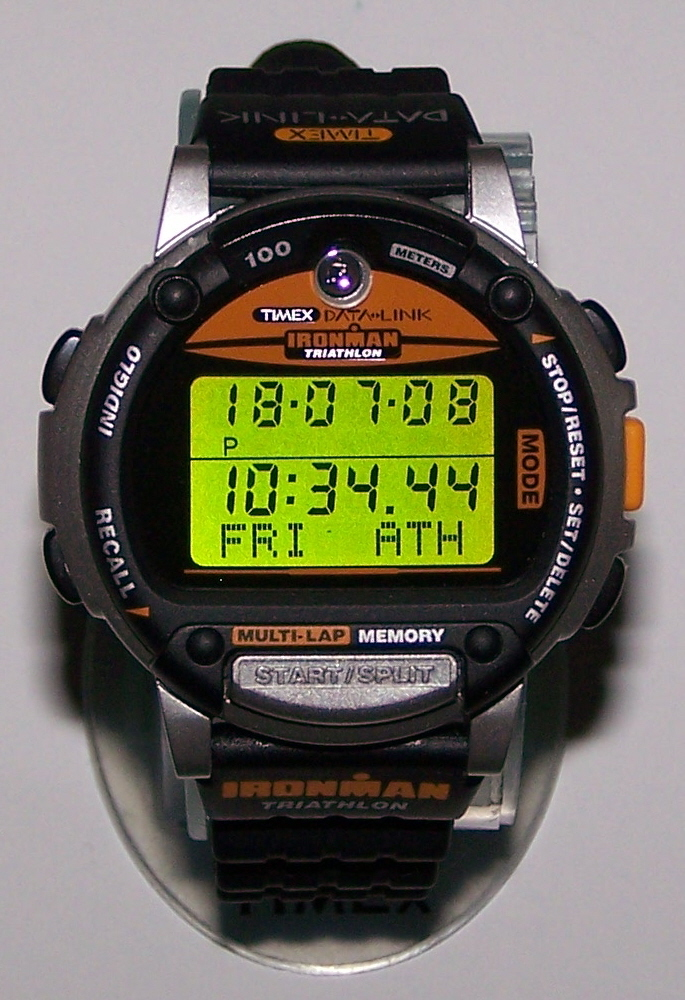
Timex Ironman Triathlon Datalink model 78401 worn by astronaut Daniel T. Barry on the STS-72 Space Shuttle Endeavour and cosmonaut Sergei K. Krikalev, Expedition 1, on the ISS, Maksim Surayev during Expedition 22, and others

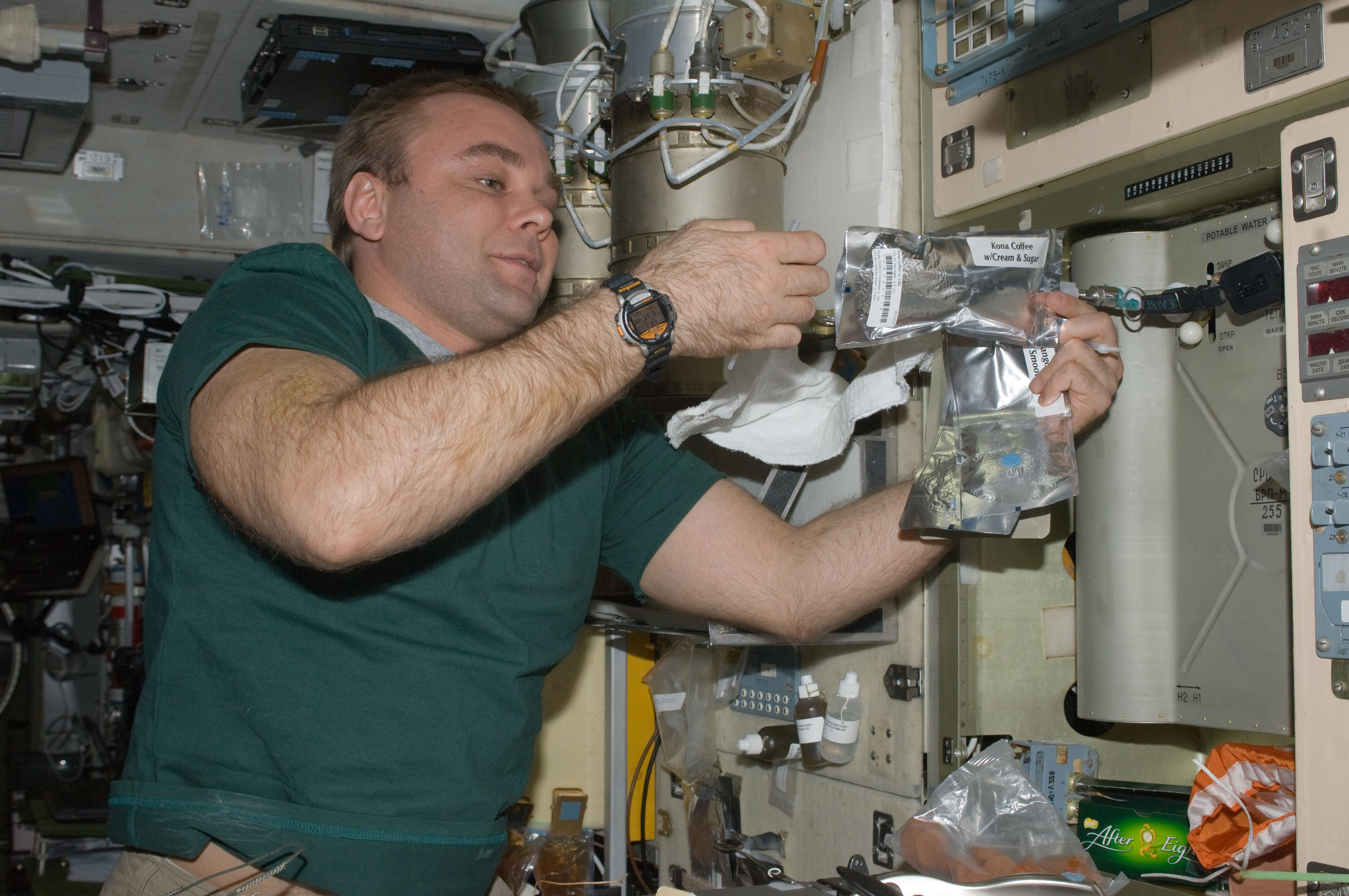
Cosmonaut Maksim Surayev wearing the Timex Ironman Triathlon Datalink model 78041 during Expedition 22 21 January 2010

The earlier models included many PDA-type functions such as anniversaries, appointments and phone directory, but did not have functions such as stopwatch and countdown timer. They had five alarms.

To add functionality, in 1997 Timex introduced the Ironman Triathlon Datalink series with features of the Ironman series, such as a choice of timers, multi-lap stopwatches, and customisable display appearance. The number of alarms increased to 10 in the new series. Messages could be displayed during an alarm, and they could be downloaded to the watch or input manually through scrolling characters, activated by two forward/reverse buttons.

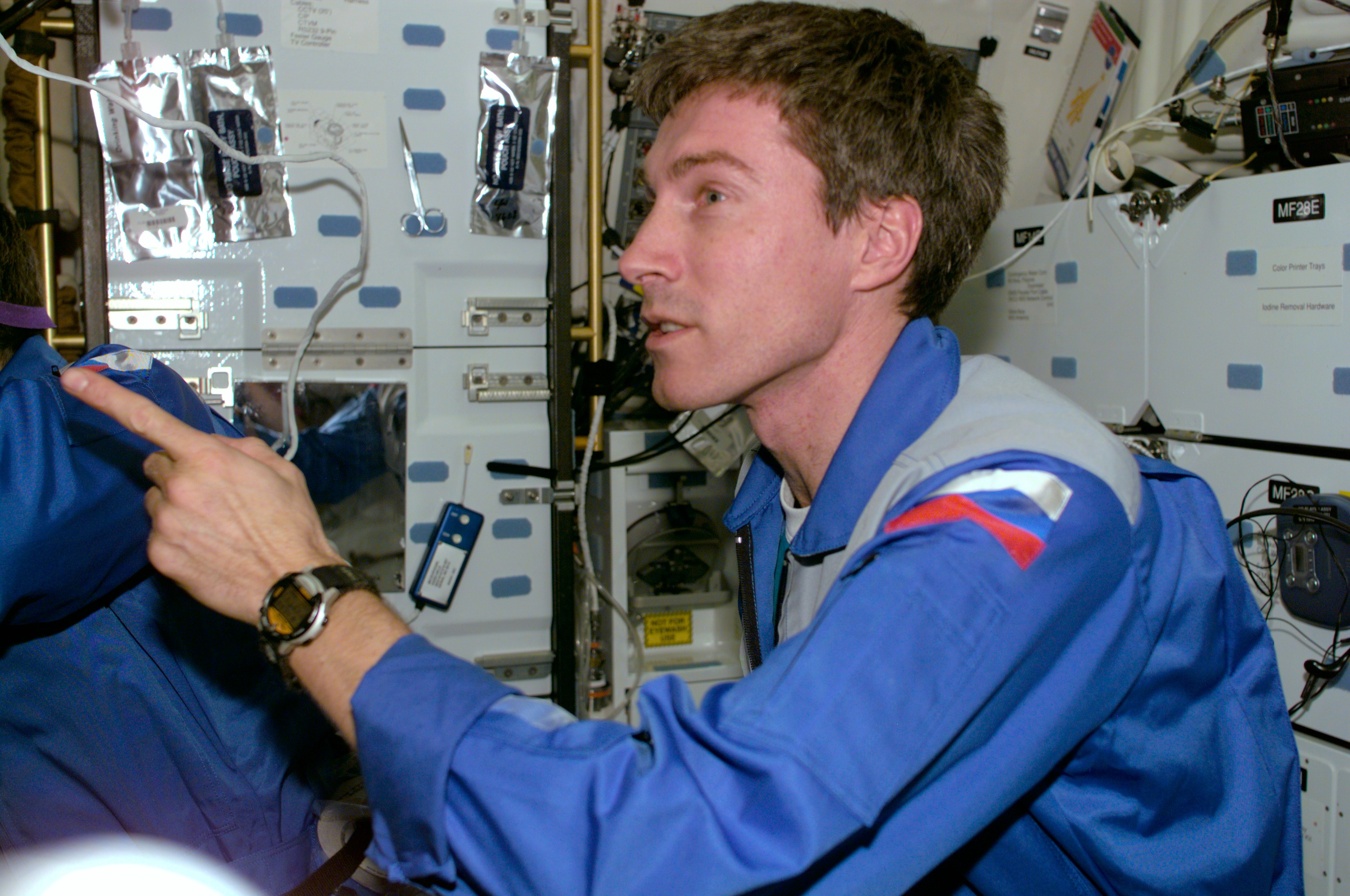
Cosmonaut Sergei Krikalev wearing the Timex Ironman Triathlon Datalink model 78041 during a visit aboard the Space Shuttle Endeavour

The new features came at the expense of some older ones. For example, the "Anniversary" and "Appointment" modes of the previous Datalink models were no longer available, and the number of phone entries for the Ironman Datalink was reduced to 38, from a maximum of 150 of the older Datalink model 150. The "Make a List" function of the Datalink 150 model was also gone. This feature enabled the user to create short lists for various tasks, and import wristapps, special programs with custom applications which could be added to the watch.

The optical sensor and the method of data transfer were retained. The display of the new series had the same architecture as that of the older models. As with the earlier models, the Triathlon Datalink included dual time zones with local time selectability. Its battery life was approximately three years under normal use.

== Notebook adapter ==
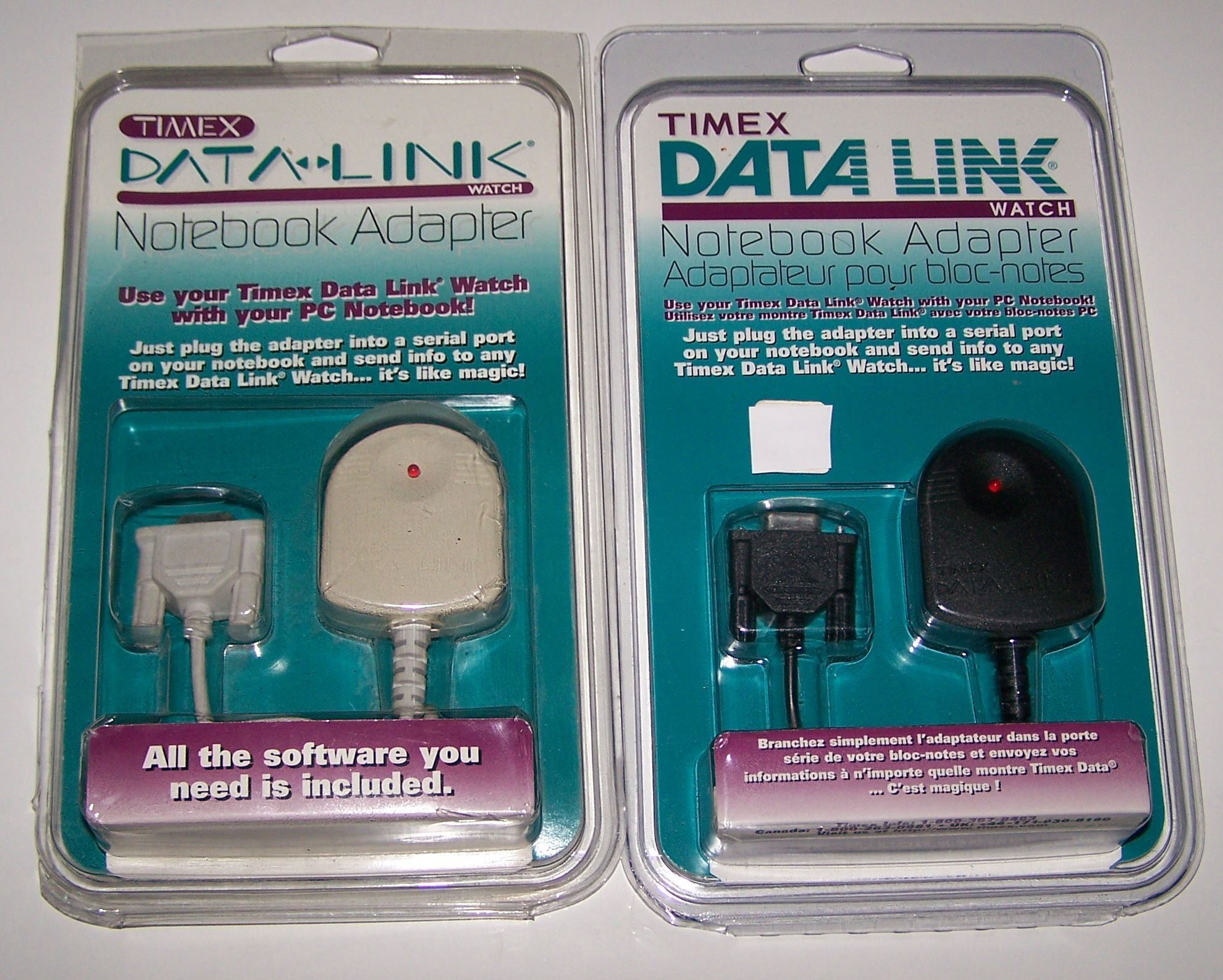
Timex Datalink Notebook Adapters in white and black. The red LED can program the watch by blinking and is visible on the saucer portion of the adapter to the right of the serial port connector.

With the advent of portable computers which use active matrix LCD screens which did not refresh like CRT monitors and therefore could not be used for data transfer, in 1997, Timex introduced a notebook adapter that incorporated a red LED and connected with the laptop through the serial port. During download, the LED flashed and the flashing programmed the watch much like the horizontal bars of the CRT.

For systems without a serial port, a USB to serial adapter can be used to connect the Timex adapter to a USB port. Alternatively, DIY Notebook Adapter emulators can be used with the original and third-party software, like timex-datalink-arduino.

== Timex Datalink USB ==
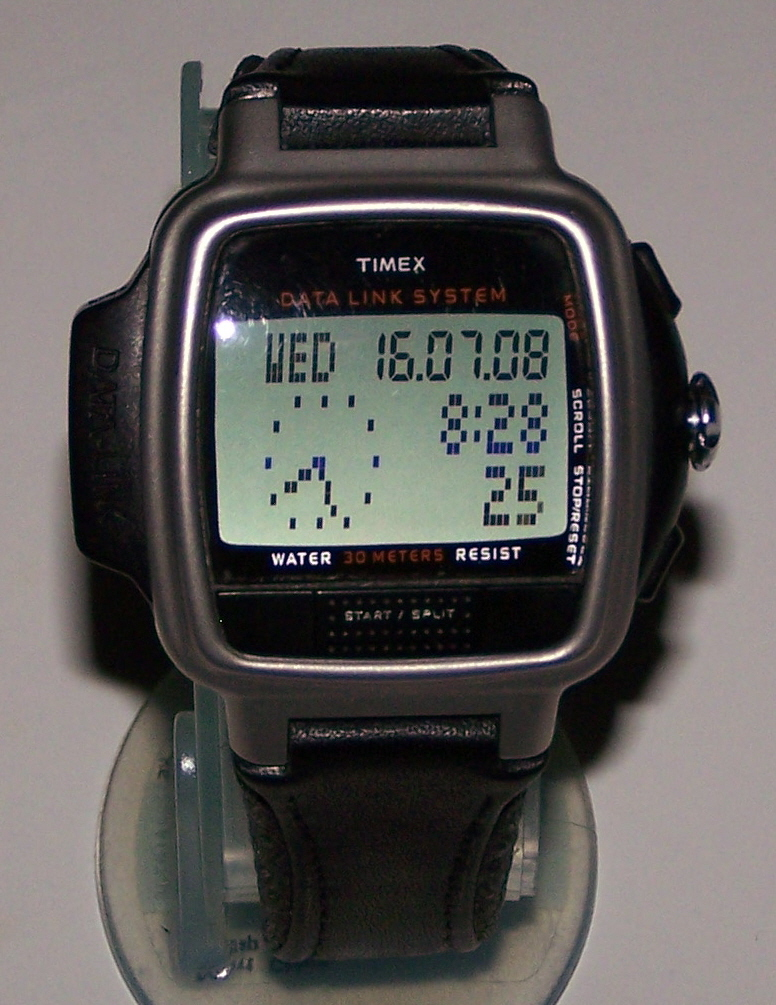
Datalink USB dress edition with a WristApp installed to display time in analog digital format

The Datalink USB was introduced in 2003. It included the Timex Ironman Datalink USB (sport edition) and the Timex Datalink USB (dress edition) models. Apart from their external appearance, and the fact that the sport edition is water-resistant to 100 metres, while the dress edition is water resistant to 30 metres, the two models had identical specifications.

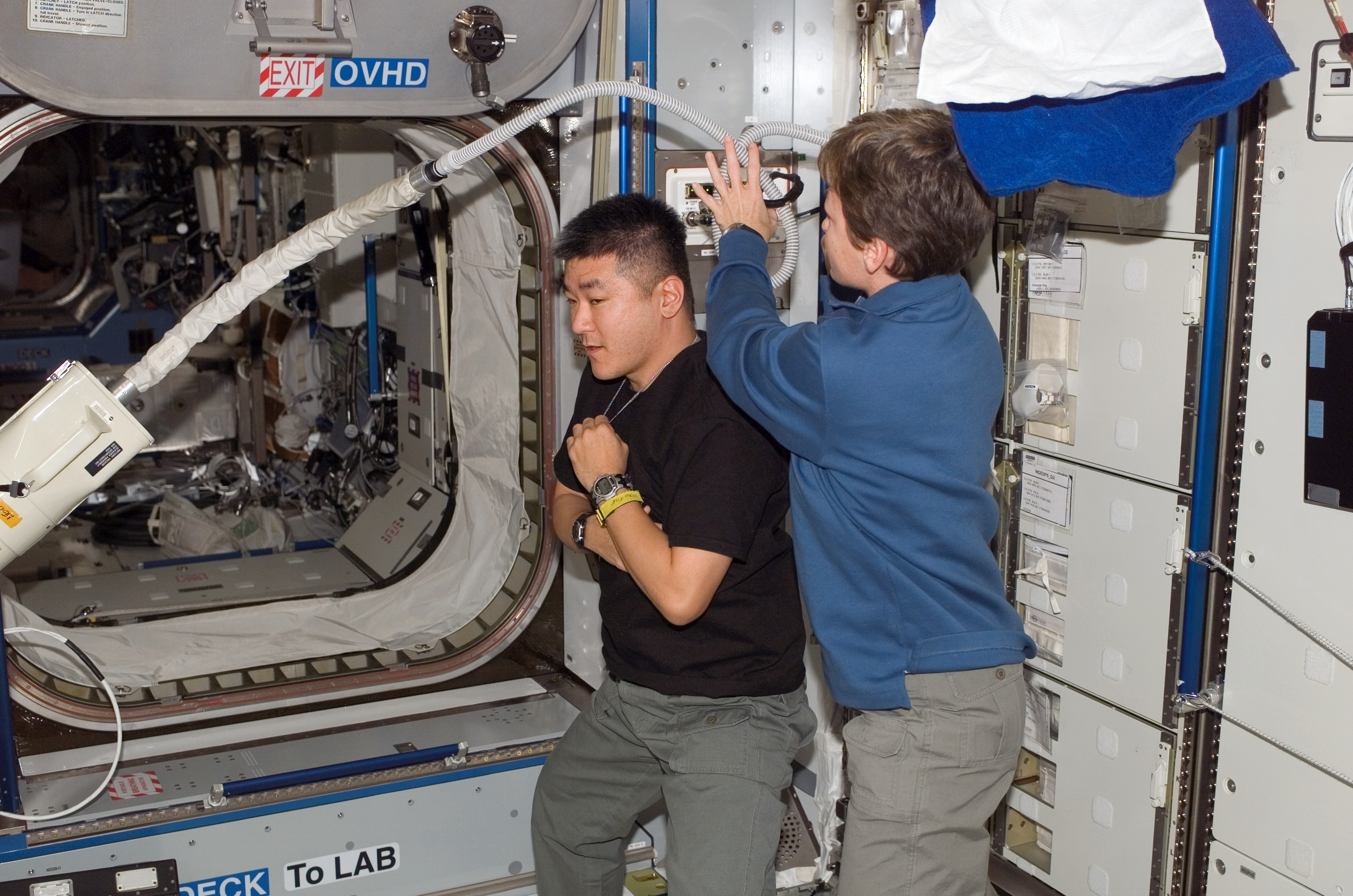
Astronaut Daniel Tani wearing two Datalink USB watches during Expedition 16

Although initially a mild disappointment for the wireless datalink purists, it gained widespread acceptance, because, although now tethered to the computer through the USB port during data transfer, the new watch featured greatly improved data transfer rates, greatly increased memory capacity and many additional and customizable modes of operation, as well as two way communication between the watch and computer.

Its modes are user customizable, with hundreds of phone numbers, alarms and timer settings. It also features three time zones, each of which can be chosen as the primary time display with the press of a button. The Datalink USB also introduced data protection through the use of a user generated password, a feature that the earlier models did not offer. The USB models also feature a rotating crown known as the Timex i-control.

=== Wrist apps ===
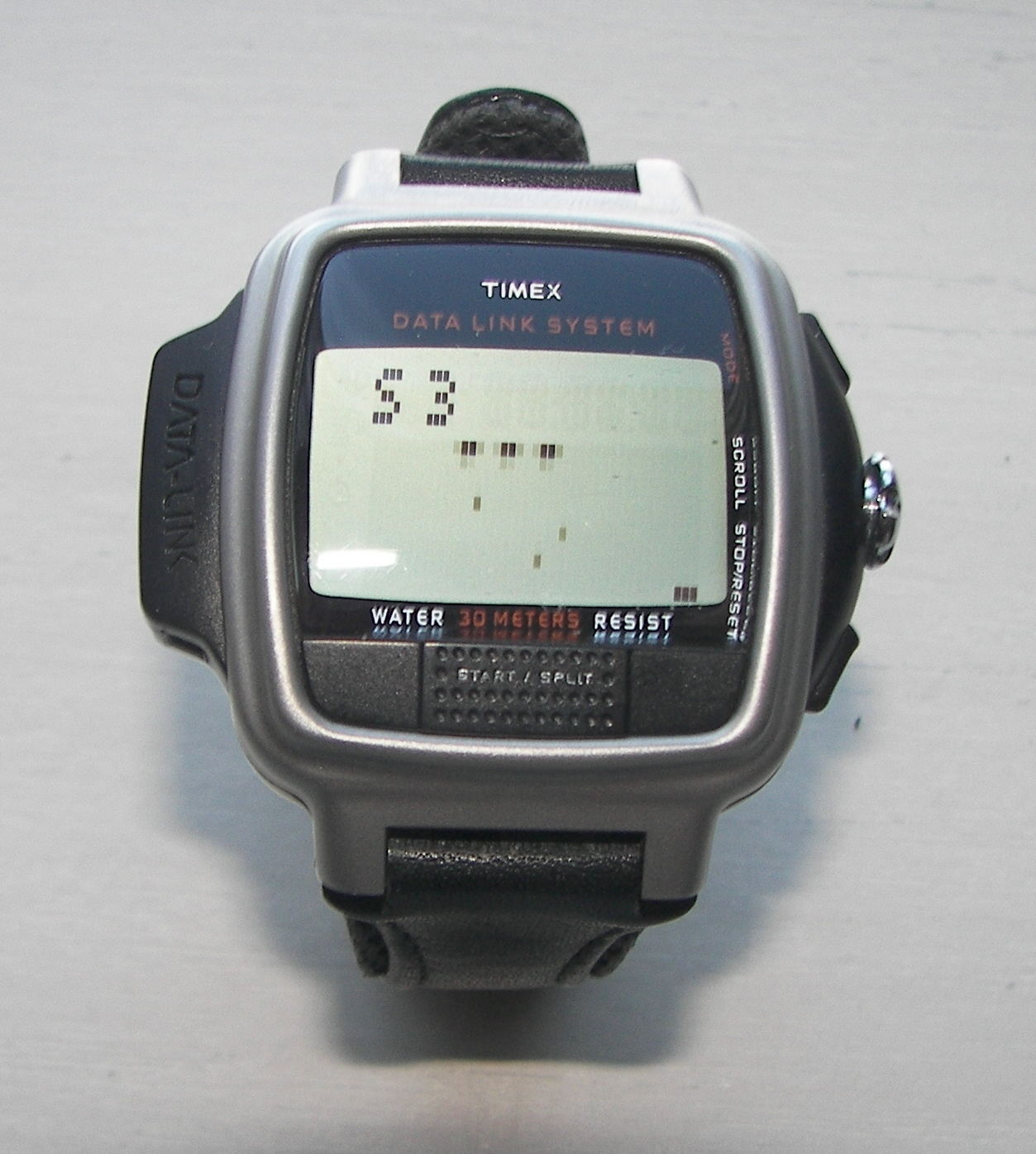
Datalink USB Dress edition with Invasion video game wrist app. (Three lives remaining). The watch crown (i-control) can be used to move the defender left to right and the fire control is the Start/Split button on the lower side of face of the watch at 6 o' clock. The pixels of the invaders appear slightly blurred upon picture magnification because of the animation of the aliens. The faint pixels diagonally to the left of the defender block are pixel traces of alien missiles.

The Datalink USB supports software programs developed specifically for the watch similar to its predecessors. These programs are called wrist applications or wrist apps for short, and they are created by independent software developers. Timex has developed an application called WristApp SDK Installer. This application can facilitate the import of any independently developed wrist app into the Datalink USB computer interface, and thus make it part of the downloadable program menu in the GUI of the watch.

Unlike its predecessors, the display of the USB series features full dot matrix architecture with no seven segment display sections. Only a small section at the top right corner uses a nine-segment display layout. Many programs have been developed, and their applications include video games, screen savers, golf score keepers, watch display contrast and scrolling speed adjustment, as well as analog watch displays, phase of the moon calculations and associated display graphics and others. The wristapps are written in assembly language.

==== Games ====
Invasion is an example of a game developed specifically for the watch. It is designed along the lines of Space Invaders, created by Jordi Perez. The game has been developed to showcase API instructions for primitive pixel displays such as the one used in the watch. The term primitive refers to displays of low resolution where one can discern the individual pixels.

==== Screen saver ====
Among the many programs and utilities which have been developed for the watch, such as football schedules, weather reports and others, there is also a screen saver which blanks out the display of the watch on the minute or the hour, appropriately called Screen Saver – Blank.

==== Antikythera ====
Another application called Antikythera emulates some of the functions of the Antikythera mechanism by calculating the phase of the moon. It is accurate to within one day in 500 years. In the future, it will also be able to calculate the sun's position in the zodiac and upcoming eclipses.

==== Wrist app examples ====
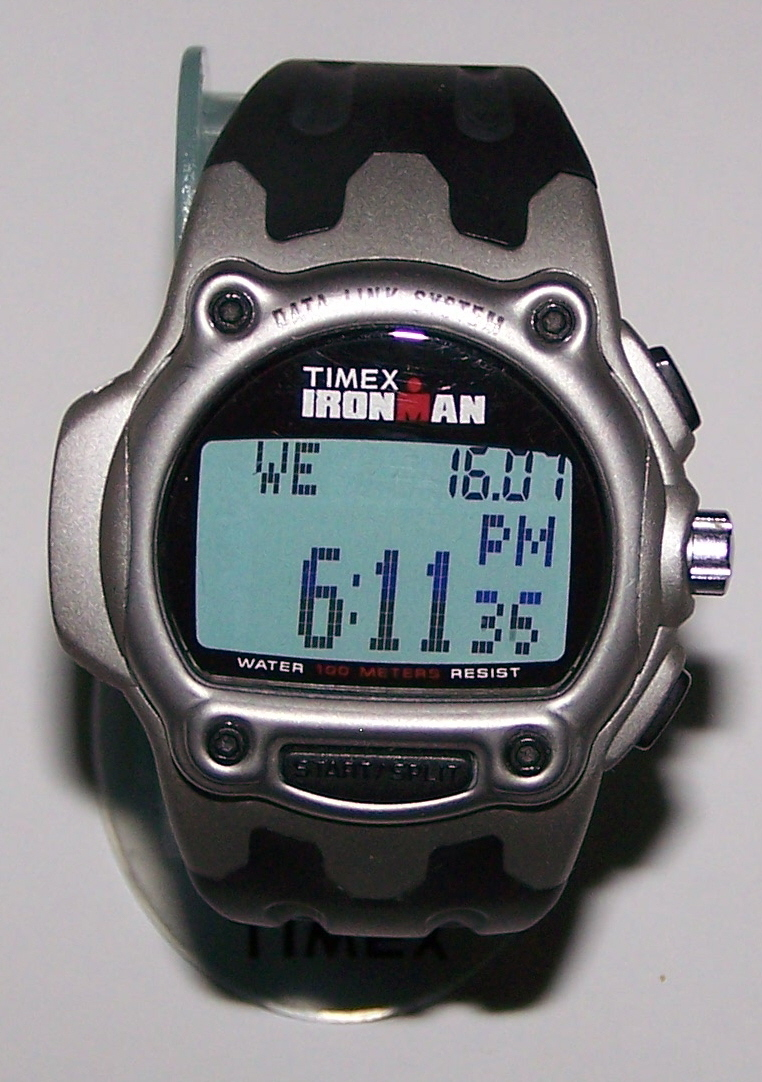
Datalink USB Sports Edition with normal display

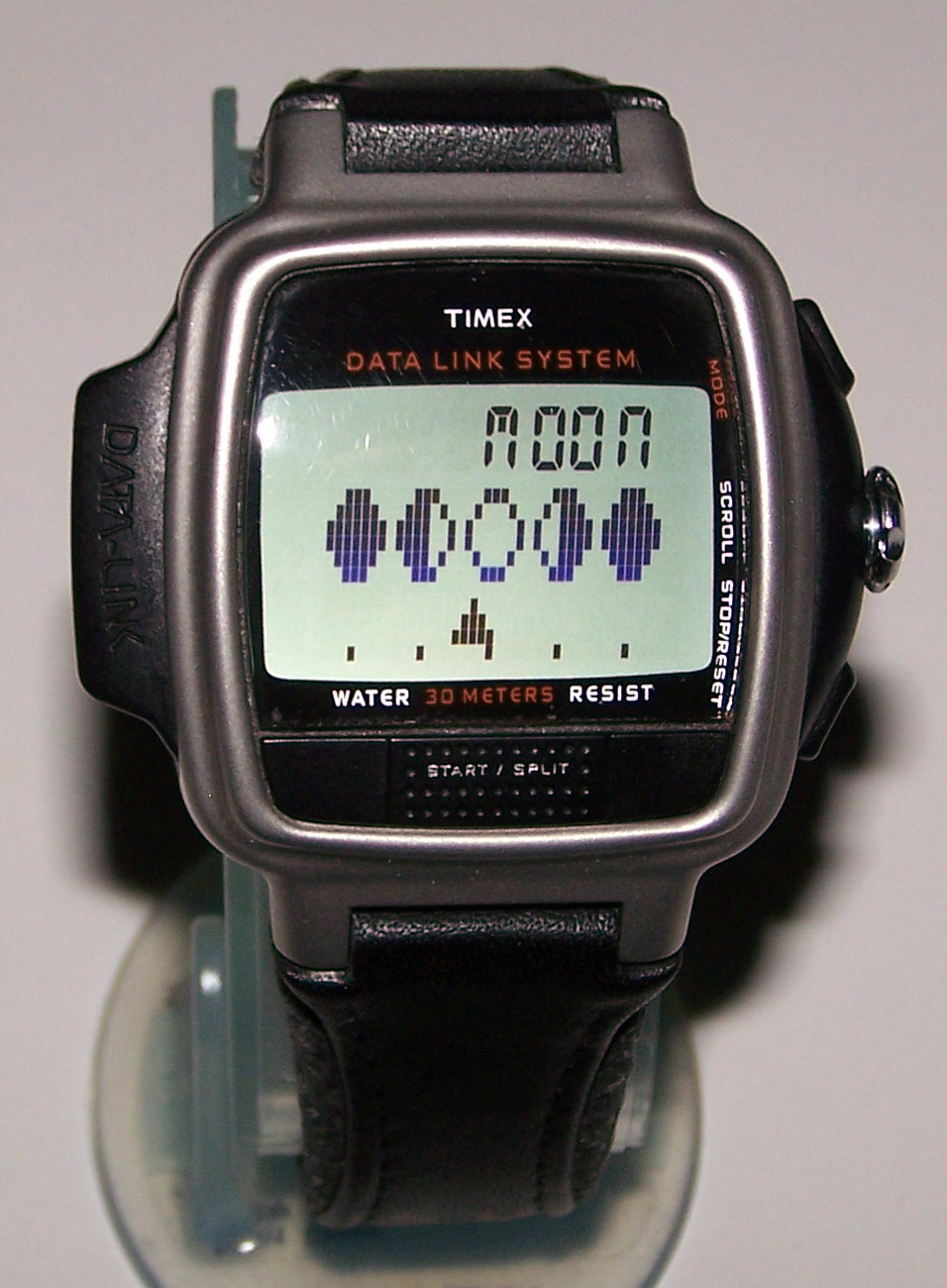
Datalink USB with Moon phase wrist app display. The arrow below the moon phases points to the exact phase.

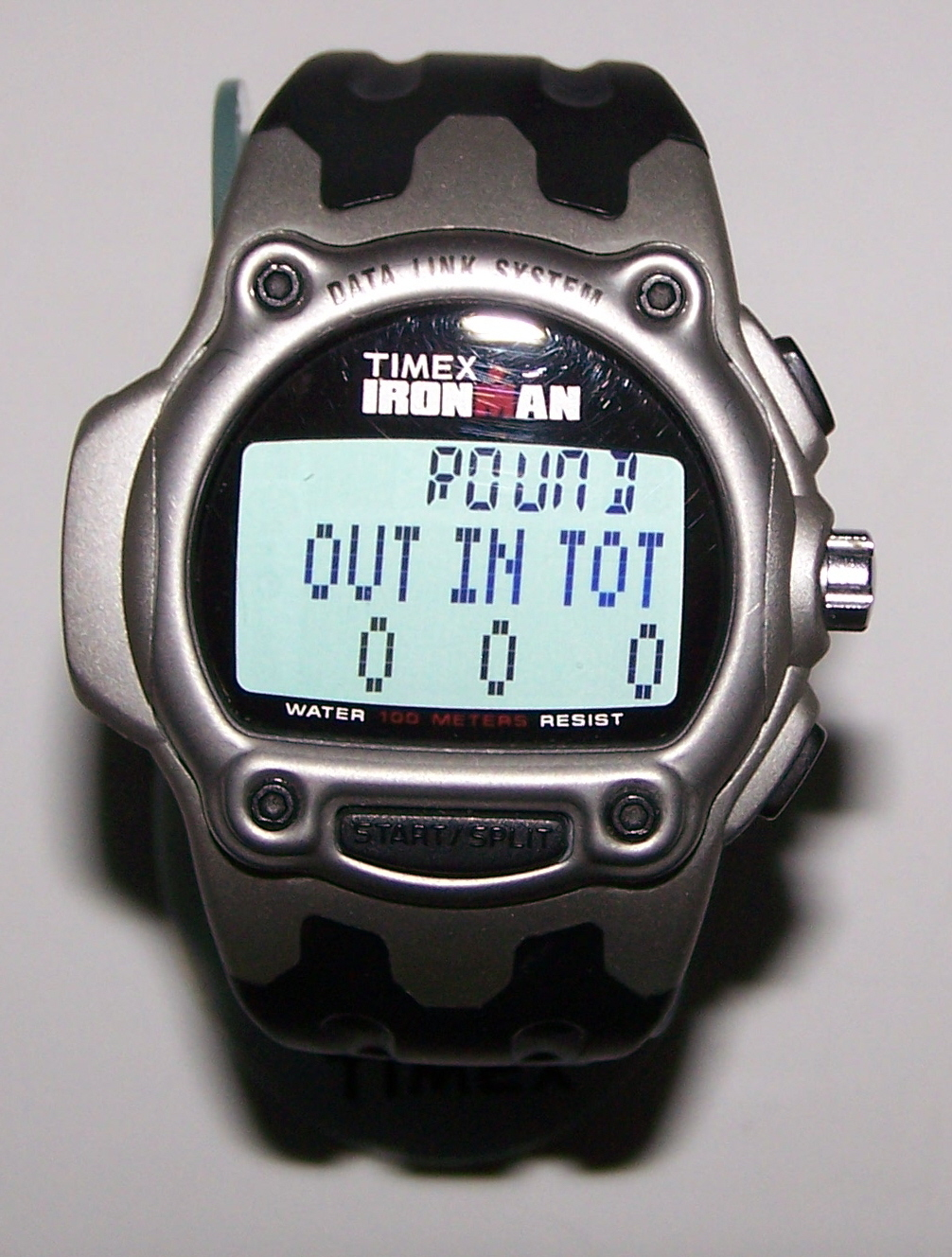
Datalink USB with Golf wrist app

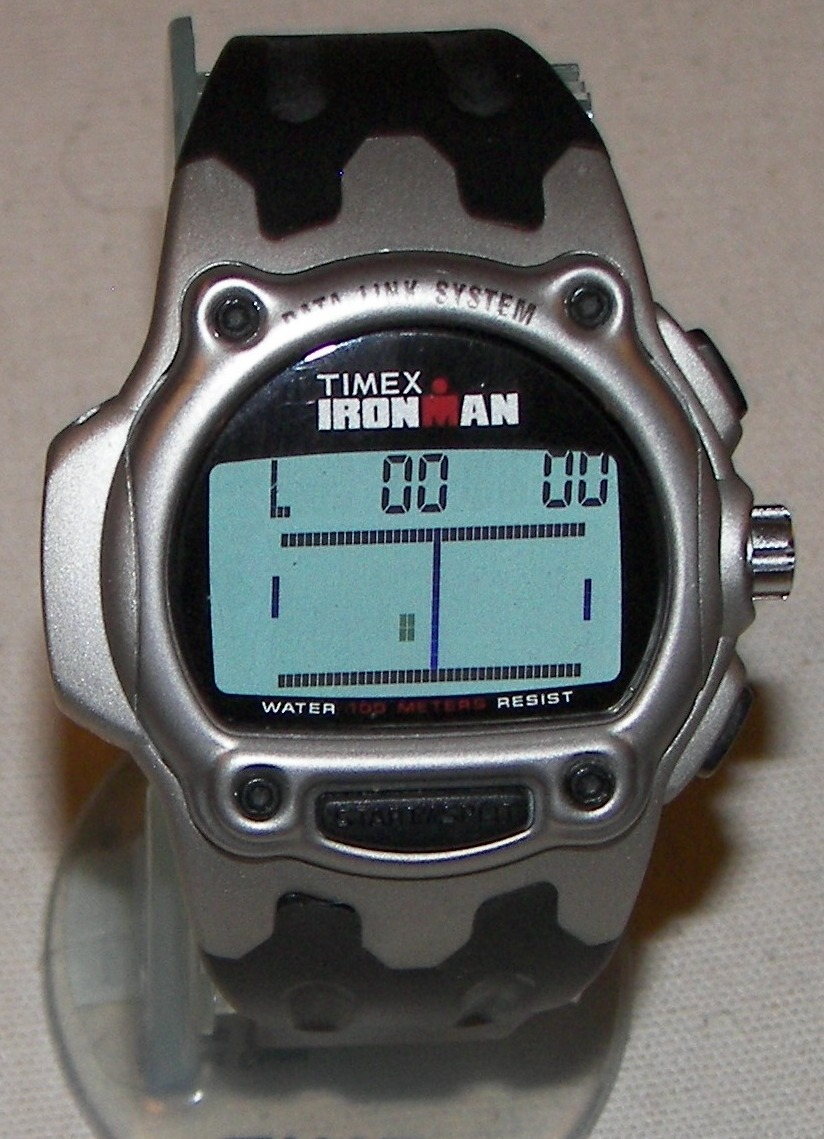
Datalink USB with Paddle wrist app, similar to Pong. The ball is close to the net at the center. The paddle moves using the crown.

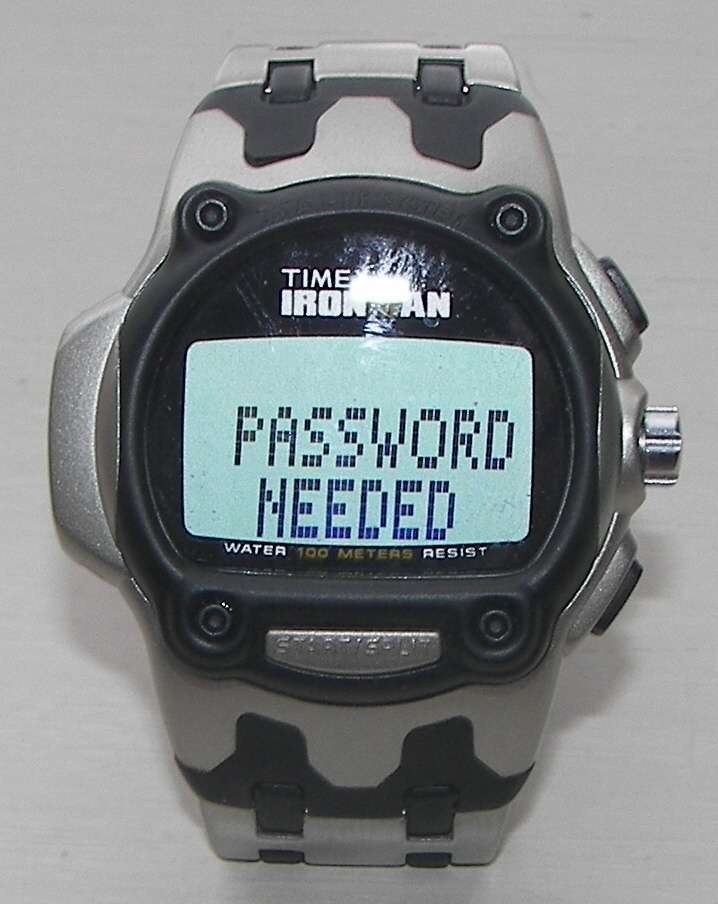
Datalink USB with password prompt

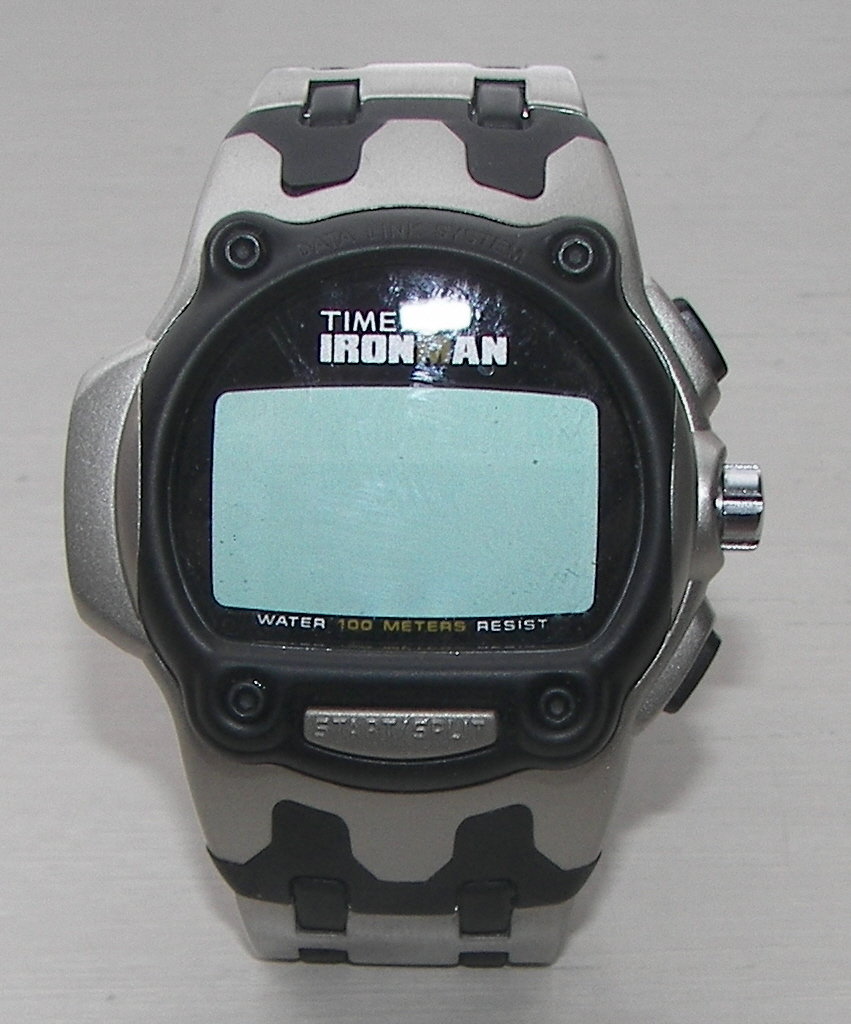
Datalink Ironman USB in screen saver mode. The screen saver activates automatically when the display is at :00 seconds.

== Space ==
Timex Datalink is flight certified by NASA for space missions and is one of four watches qualified by NASA for space travel. The various Datalink models are used both by cosmonauts and astronauts. For instance during Expedition 1 the crew log for January mentions:

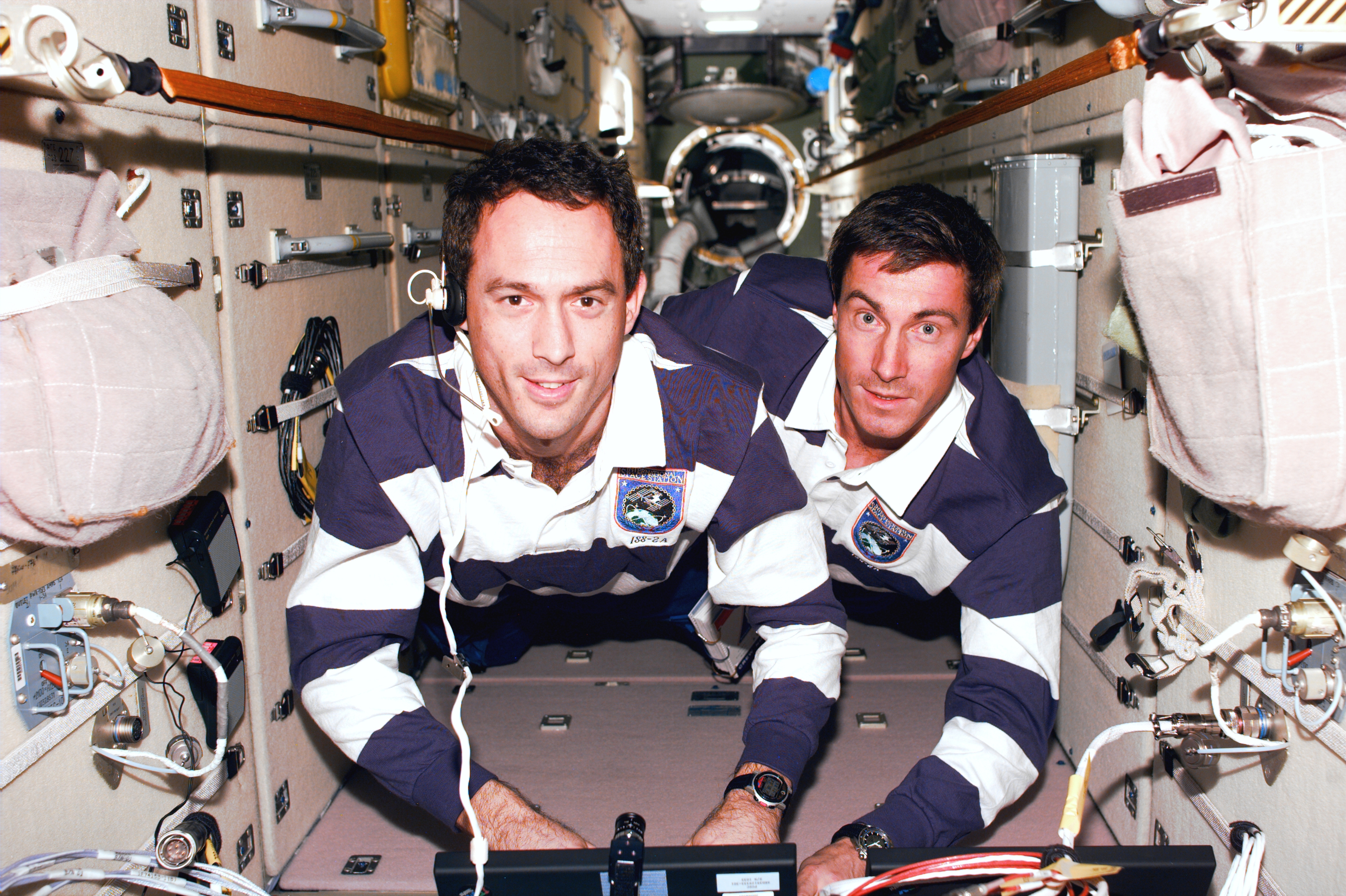
Astronaut James H. Newman wears the Timex Datalink model 70502 on STS-88.

Expedition 1 commander William Shepherd wears the Timex Datalink 150 on his left wrist.

We have been working with the Timex software. Many thanks to the folks who got this up to us. It seems we each have a different version of the datalink watch, and of course, the software is different with each. Yuri and Sergei are able to load up a day's worth of alarms, but Shep has the Datalink 150, and this has a 5 alarm limit. So 2/3 of the crew are now happy. All this is a pretty good argument for training like you are going to fly-we should have caught this one ourselves in our training work on the ground.

In another part of the January log it is mentioned:

Missed a whole comm. pass over White Sands. We need to get the timex watches working so we don't overlook these calls.

while in another segment of the same log:

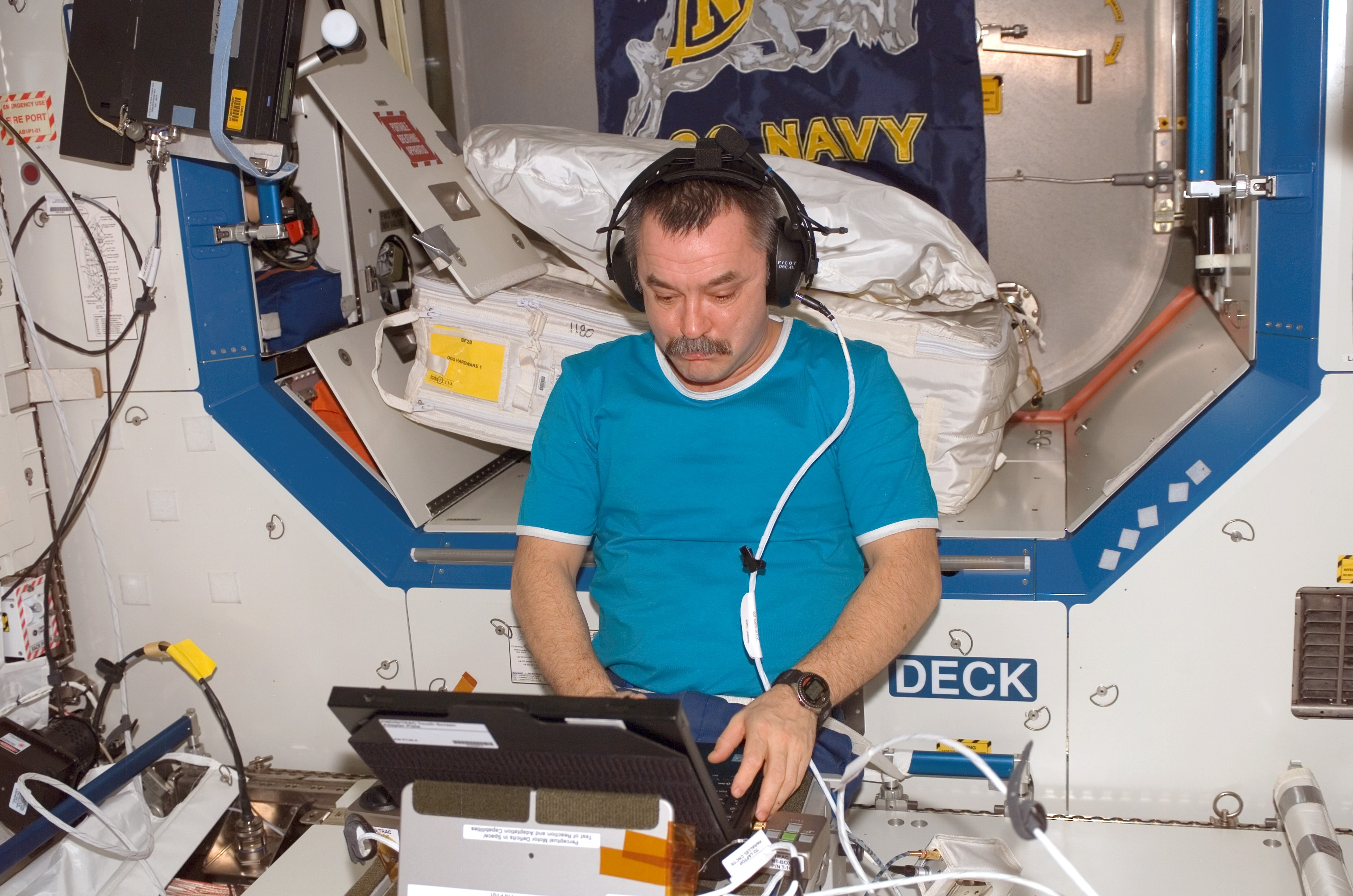
Cosmonaut Mikhail Tyurin, Expedition 14 flight engineer with the Test of Reaction and Adaptation Capabilities (TRAC) experiment in the Destiny laboratory of the International Space Station wearing Datalink 150 model 69721 in January 2007

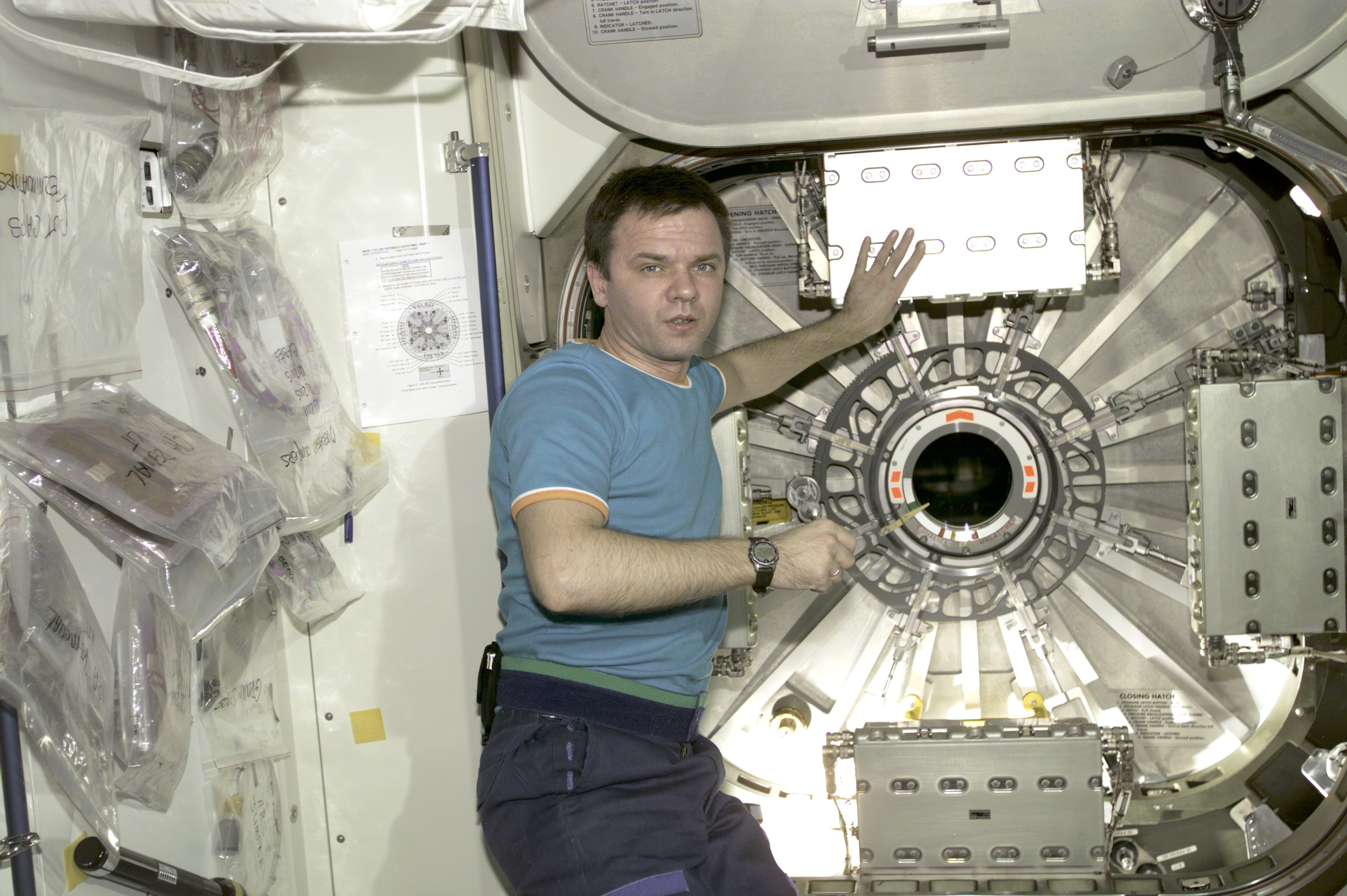
Cosmonaut Yuri Gidzenko, Expedition One Soyuz commander wearing Datalink 150 model 69931

As 5A is now delayed, we would like to request the "timex" watch software if it is available on the ground-a file that can be uplinked to us. This will help us manage our day as we can load comm. passes into the watches.

and from the February and March crew log of Expedition 1:

We copy the request from Houston on the timex watches. We will keep using the ones we have onboard-there are some workarounds we can apply that will help the limited "alarm" situation. We don't request any more watches be sent up on 5A, but thanks to all the crew equipment folks for asking. As a heads-up to Exp 2, any plans to use the timex download capability should include more laptop IR transmitters. We have 1 onboard, but more will be required if the next crew wants to fully use this capability.

The laptop IR transmitter mentioned in the February and March crew log is the Timex notebook adapter. "Exp 2" refers to Expedition 2, and the log mentions they may need more notebook adapters for the upcoming expedition.

== Cult and popular culture ==
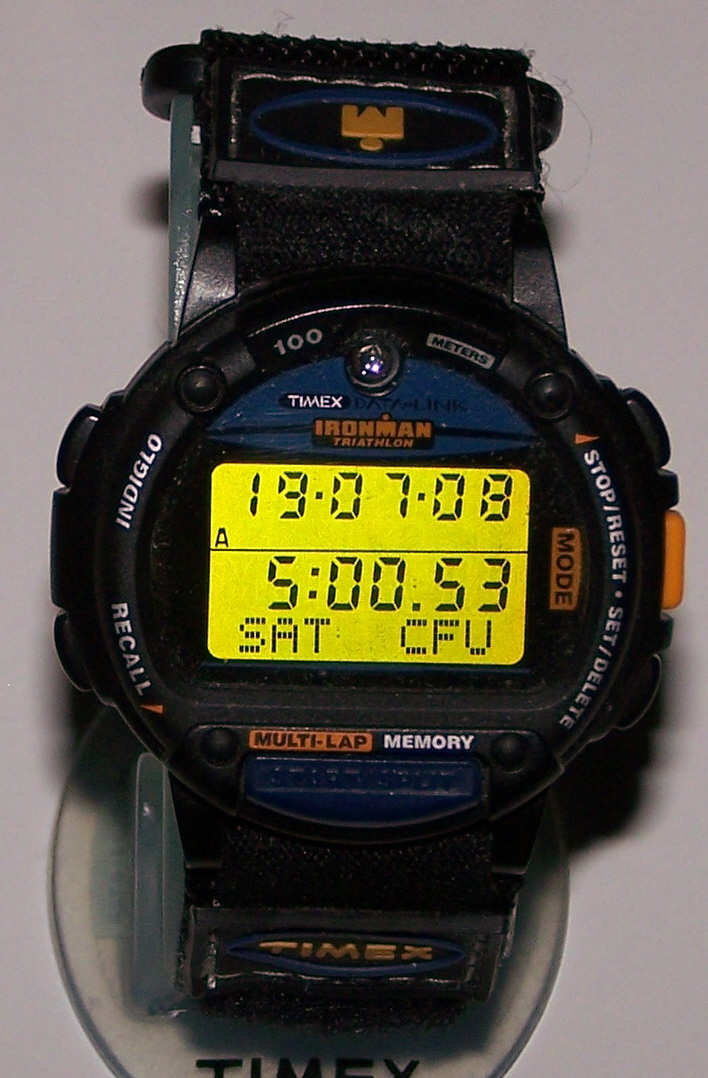
Ironman Datalink with velcro strap

Due to its unique features and long tradition, many websites are dedicated to the programming of the watch.

The early Datalink 50/150 models received a tongue in cheek "[dis]honorable" mention in PC World's "25 Worst Tech Products of All Time" list in 2006 and were inducted in "the high tech hall of shame", with the rationale that "It looked like a Casio on steroids" and "To download data to it, you held it in front of your CRT monitor while the monitor displayed a pattern of flashing black-and-white stripes (which, incidentally, also turned you into the Manchurian Candidate)", referring to the earlier, flashing CRT method of data transfer, adding that "Depending on your point of view, it was either seriously cool or deeply disturbing".

Timex Datalink watches are referred to as "classics" and as "worn by astronauts to the moon" in Jeffery Deaver's crime thriller novel The Burning Wire.

They are also featured at the online exhibit of the National Museum of American History.

== Awards ==
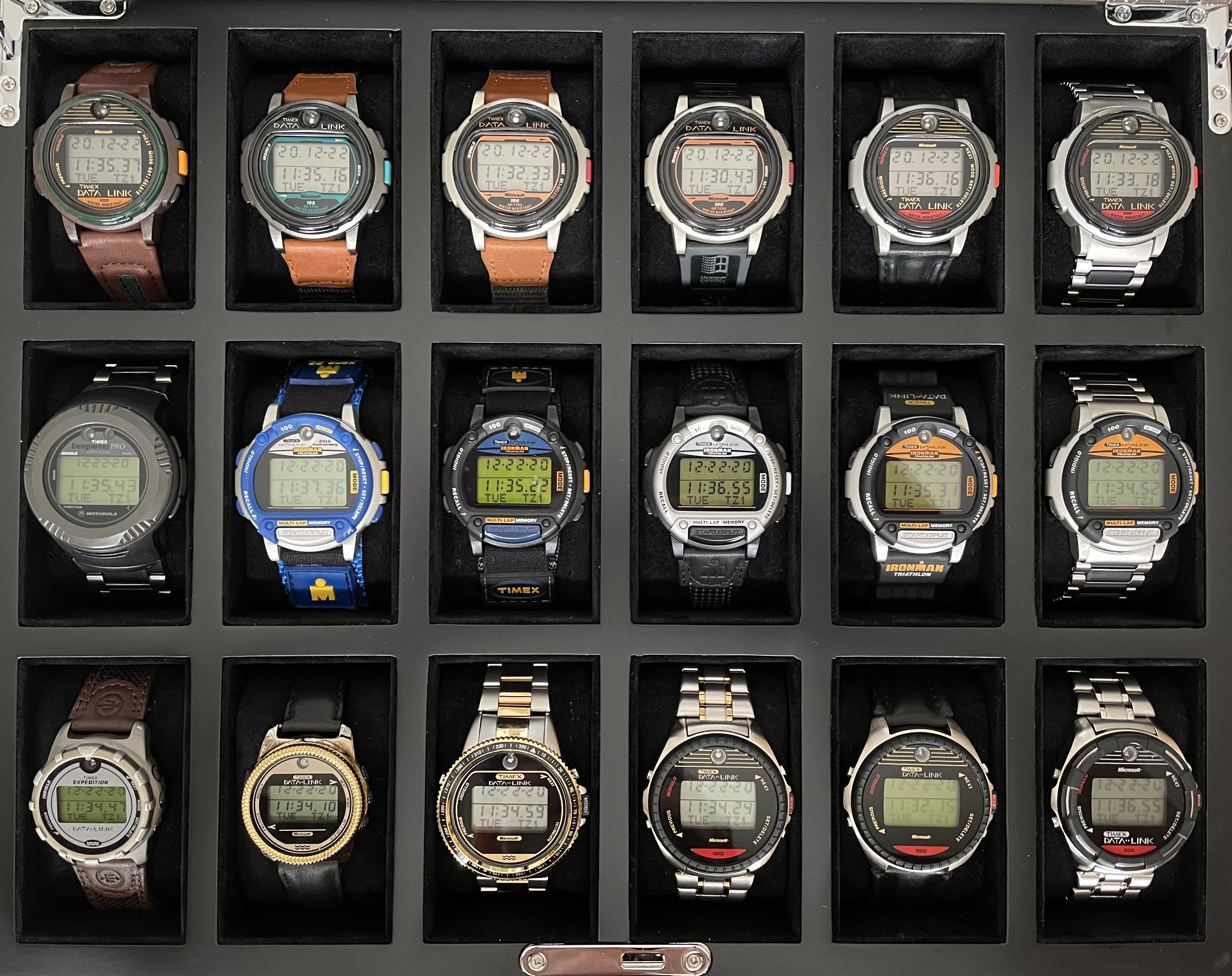
Collection of Timex Datalink watches with an optical sensor. Model numbers (from left to right, top to bottom): 70532, 70342, 70302, 70301, 70502, 70518, 80011 Beepwear Pro, 51041 Ironman 20th Anniversary Kona '98 Edition, T51081, 78701, 78041, 78047, 69931, 69901, 69787, 69737, 69721, 69768

- Popular Science's Best of What's New Award (1995) (Watch award).
- Design and Engineering Award from Popular Mechanics (1995) (Watch award).
- Innovations '97 awards (Awarded to both the Data Link Notebook Adapter and the Timex Data Link 150S watch).
- Byte Magazine Best of Comdex award.
- R&D Magazine Top 100 Products.
- Windows Magazine Outstanding Technology Award.

== Timex Beepwear Datalink ==
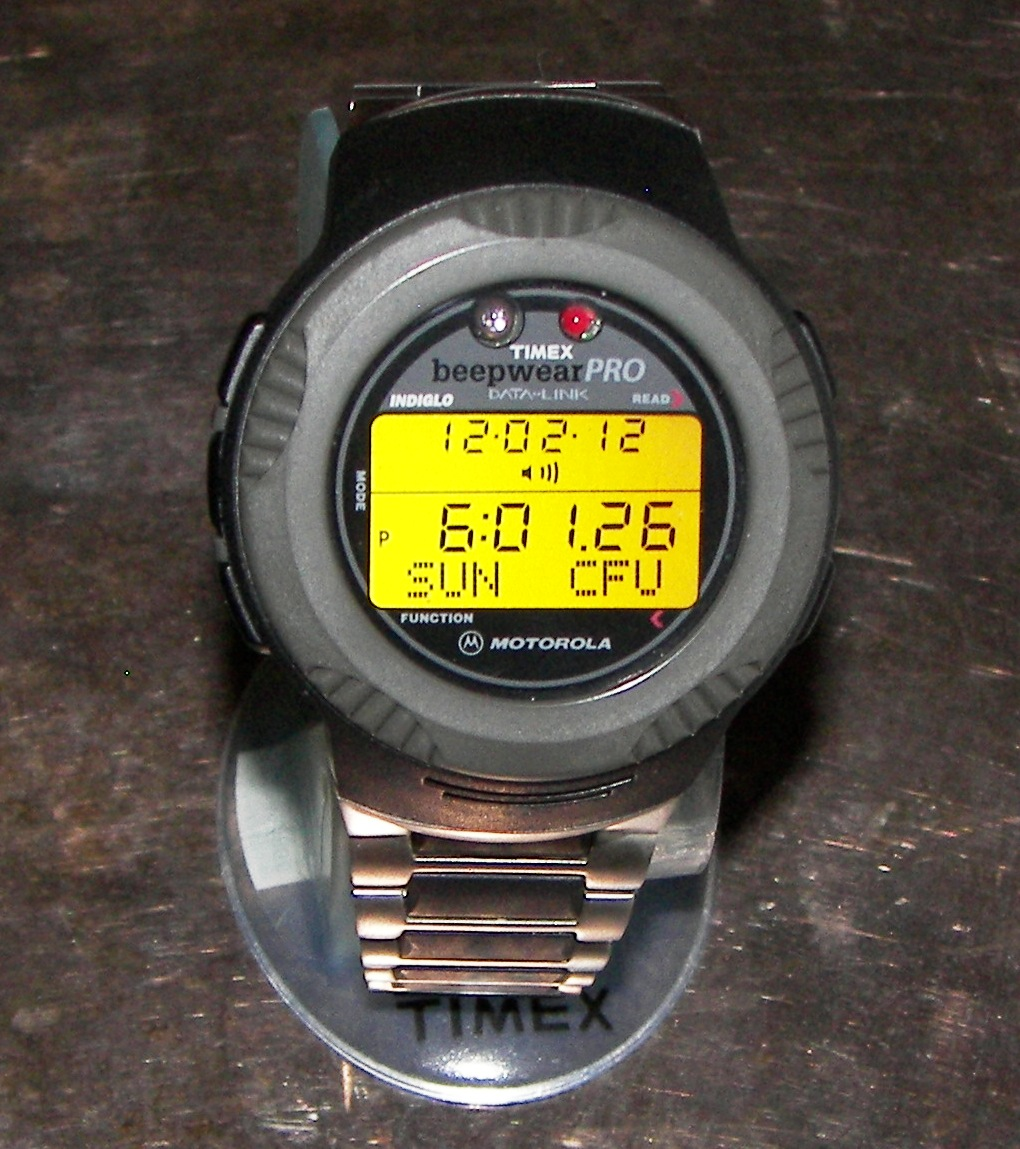
Timex Datalink Beepwear Pro

The Timex Beepwear Datalink series features wearable pagers, using the Timex datalink platform. These watches also function as electronic organisers. The Beepware series is patented and was the product of a joint Timex-Motorola effort which resulted in a new company called Beepwear Paging Products. The Beepwear marketing motto was: "One beeping great watch". It was the first watch/pager able to receive alphanumeric messages. It operates in the 900 MHz band. Beepware also featured FLEXtime which, if supported by the service provider, could synchronise the time of the watch with that of the network. It could also automatically adjust to the time zone of the wearer.
