= Jordan Falcon =

Tactical UAV

The Jordan Falcon, a joint venture between the King Abdulla Design and Development Bureau and Jordan Aerospace Industries, is a compact tactical unmanned aerial vehicle (UAV) capable of performing a wide range of aerial robotic applications. It performs real-time day and night reconnaissance, remote sensing, surveillance and target acquisition up to a range of 50 km.

The Jordan Falcon is powered by a quiet 200cc two-stroke engine burning a conventional gas/oil mixture with fuel for a 4-hour flight stored in the aircraft's fuselage tank. Additional fuel tanks may be equipped to provide added capacity. A generator and an emergency onboard batteries power the aircraft and payload.

Its heading, altitude, airspeed and GPS waypoint navigation are fully controlled by an autopilot. A 5-watt video/telemetry microwave datalink transmits real-time imagery and vehicle telemetry back from the UAV at ranges up to 50 km.

== Specifications ==
- Stall speed, SLS - 80 km/h (50 mph)
- Maximum speed, SLS - 180 km/h (110 mph)
- Cruise speed, SLS - 120 km/h (75 mph)
- Operational maximum range (still air) - 450 km/h
- Operational endurance - 4 h
- MGTOW - 60 kg (132 lb)
- Empty weight - 40 kg (88 lb)
- Maximum fuel - 14 kg (30 lb)
- Payload - 6 kg (13 lb)
