= STS-88 =

First Space Shuttle mission to the International Space Station

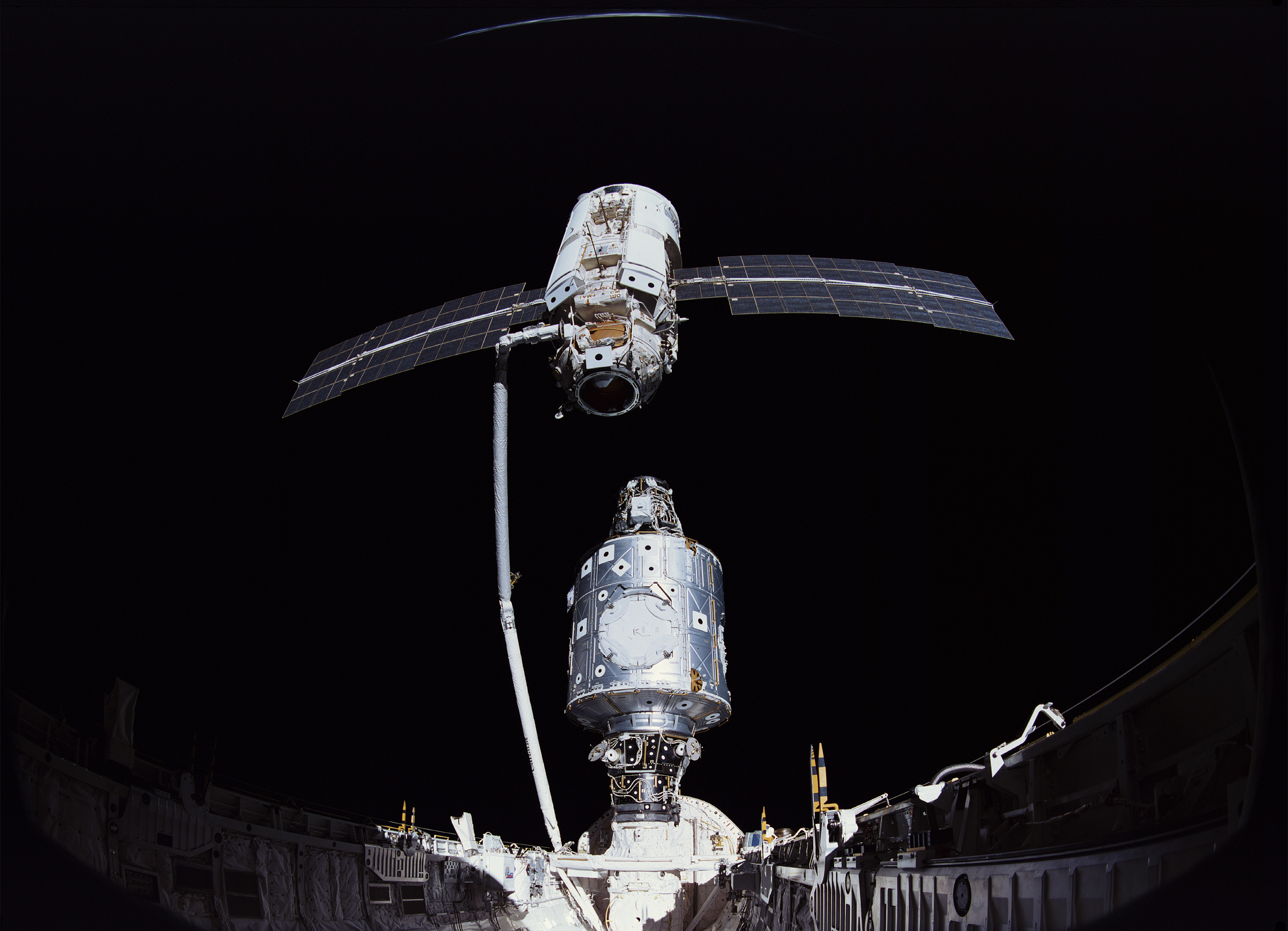
- Endeavour's Canadarm positions Zarya above Unity, immediately prior to mating
- Names: Space Transportation System-88
- Mission type: ISS assembly
- Operator: NASA
- COSPAR ID: 1998-069A
- SATCAT no.: 25549
- Mission duration: 11 days, 19 hours, 18 minutes, 47 seconds.
- Distance travelled: 7,600,000 kilometers (4,700,000 mi)
- Orbits completed: 186

Spacecraft properties
- Spacecraft: Space Shuttle Endeavour
- Launch mass: 119,715 kilograms (263,927 lb)
- Landing mass: 90,853 kilograms (200,296 lb)

Crew
- Crew size: 6
- Members: Robert D. Cabana; Frederick W. Sturckow; Jerry L. Ross; Nancy J. Currie; James H. Newman; Sergei K. Krikalev

Start of mission
- Launch date: 4 December 1998, 08:35:34 UTC
- Launch site: Kennedy, LC-39A

End of mission
- Landing date: 16 December 1998, 03:53 UTC
- Landing site: Kennedy, SLF Runway 15

Orbital parameters
- Reference system: Geocentric
- Regime: Low Earth
- Perigee altitude: 388 kilometres (241 mi)
- Apogee altitude: 401 kilometres (249 mi)
- Inclination: 51.6 degrees
- Period: 92.4 minutes

Docking with ISS
- Docking port: Zarya forward (via PMA-2, Unity and PMA-1)
- Docking date: 7 December 1998, 02:07 UTC
- Undocking date: 13 December 1998, 20:24 UTC
- Time docked: 6 days, 18 hours 17 minutes
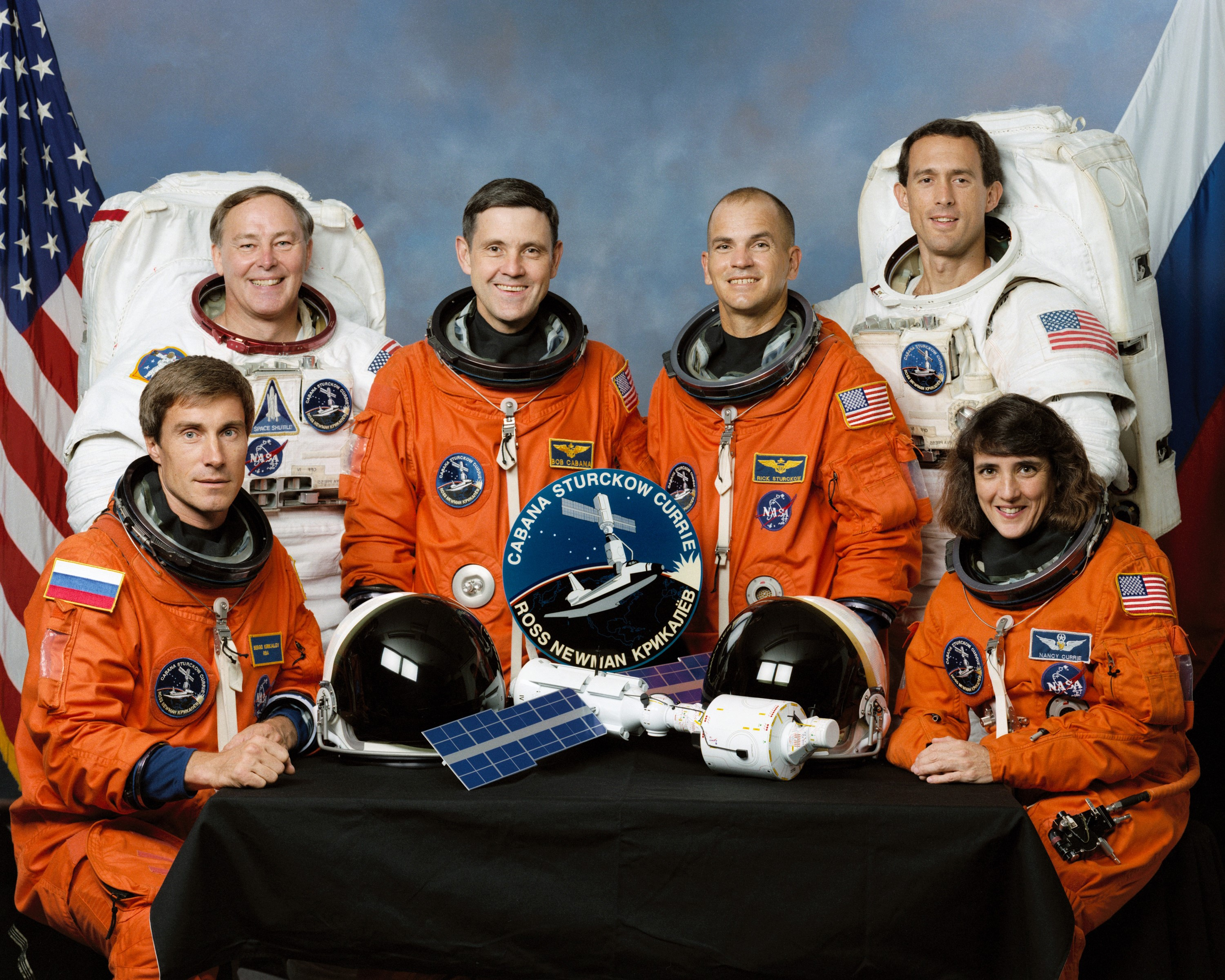
- Left to right – Front: Krikalev, Currie; Back: Ross, Cabana, Sturckow, Newman Space Shuttle program

STS-88 was the first Space Shuttle mission to the International Space Station (ISS). It was flown by Space Shuttle Endeavour, and took the first American module, the Unity node, to the station.

The seven-day mission was highlighted by the mating of the U.S.-built Unity node to the Functional Cargo Block (Zarya module) already in orbit, and three spacewalks to connect power and data transmission cables between the Node and the FGB. Zarya, built by Boeing and the Russian Space Agency, was launched on a Russian Proton rocket from the Baikonur Cosmodrome in Kazakhstan in November 1998.

Other payloads on the STS-88 mission included the IMAX Cargo Bay Camera (ICBC), the Argentine Scientific Applications Satellite-S (SAC-A), the MightySat 1 Hitchhiker payload, the Space Experiment Module (SEM-07) and Getaway Special G-093 sponsored by the University of Michigan.

== Crew ==
Position	Astronaut
Commander	(United States) Robert D. Cabana; Fourth and last spaceflight
Pilot	(United States) Frederick W. Sturckow; First spaceflight
Mission Specialist 1	(United States) Jerry L. Ross; Sixth spaceflight
Mission Specialist 2 Flight Engineer	(United States) Nancy J. Currie; Third spaceflight
Mission Specialist 3	(United States) James H. Newman; Third spaceflight
Mission Specialist 4	(Russia) Sergei K. Krikalev, RKA; Fourth spaceflight

=== Launch attempts ===
Attempt	Planned	Result	Turnaround	Reason	Decision point	Weather go (%)	Notes
1	3 Dec 1998, 3:58:19 am	Scrubbed	—	Technical	3 Dec 1998, 4:03 am (T−00:00:19)	40	Master alarm due to hydraulic problem.
2	4 Dec 1998, 3:35:34 am	Success	0 days 23 hours 37 minutes			60	

=== Crew seat assignments ===
Seat	Launch	Landing	Seats 1–4 are on the flight deck. Seats 5–7 are on the mid-deck.
1	Cabana		Seats 1–4 are on the flight deck. Seats 5–7 are on the mid-deck.
2	Sturckow		Seats 1–4 are on the flight deck. Seats 5–7 are on the mid-deck.
3	Ross	Newman	Seats 1–4 are on the flight deck. Seats 5–7 are on the mid-deck.
4	Currie-Gregg		Seats 1–4 are on the flight deck. Seats 5–7 are on the mid-deck.
5	Newman	Ross	Seats 1–4 are on the flight deck. Seats 5–7 are on the mid-deck.
6	Krikalev		Seats 1–4 are on the flight deck. Seats 5–7 are on the mid-deck.
7	Unused		Seats 1–4 are on the flight deck. Seats 5–7 are on the mid-deck.

== Mission highlights ==
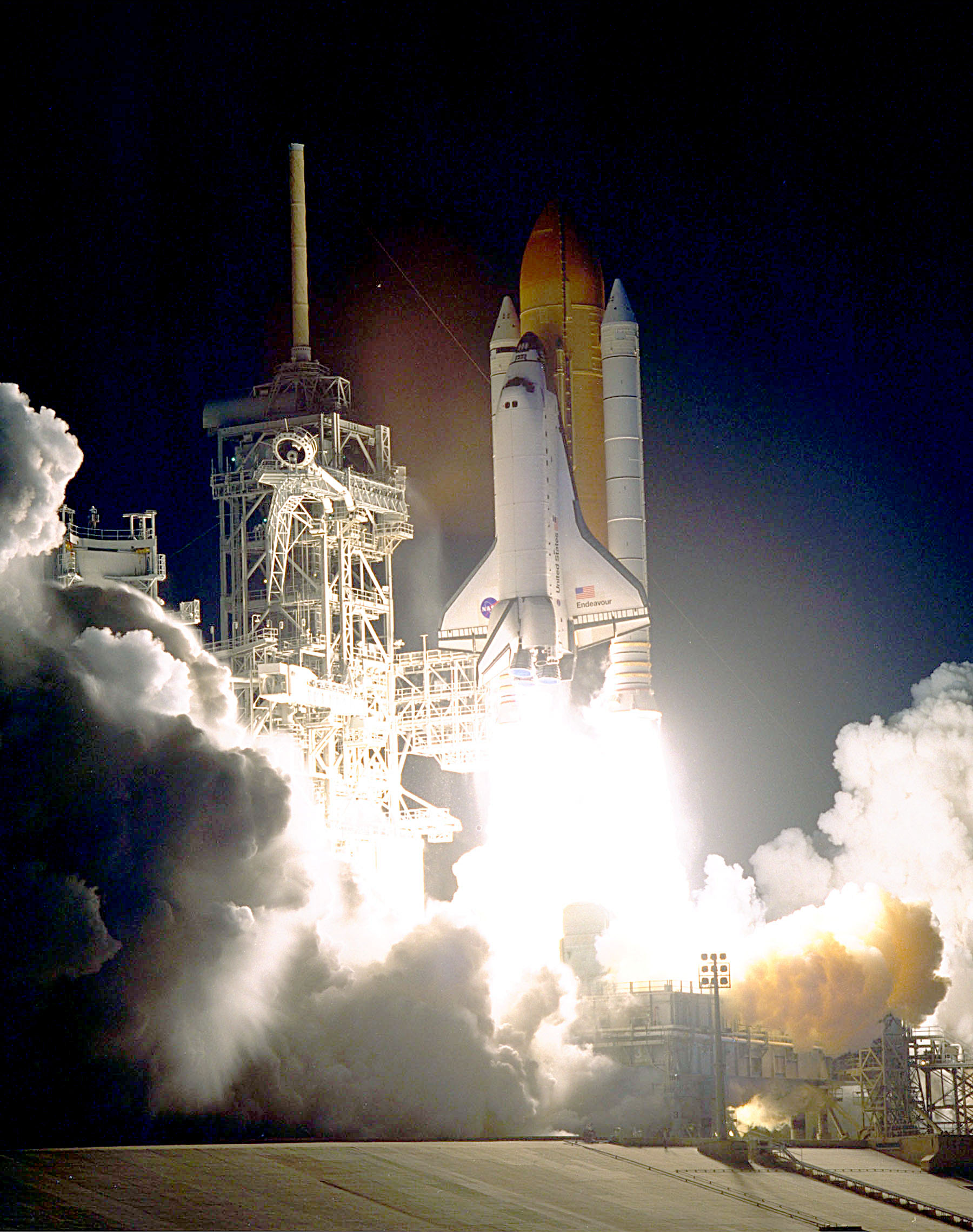
STS-88 launches from Kennedy Space Center, 4 December 1998.

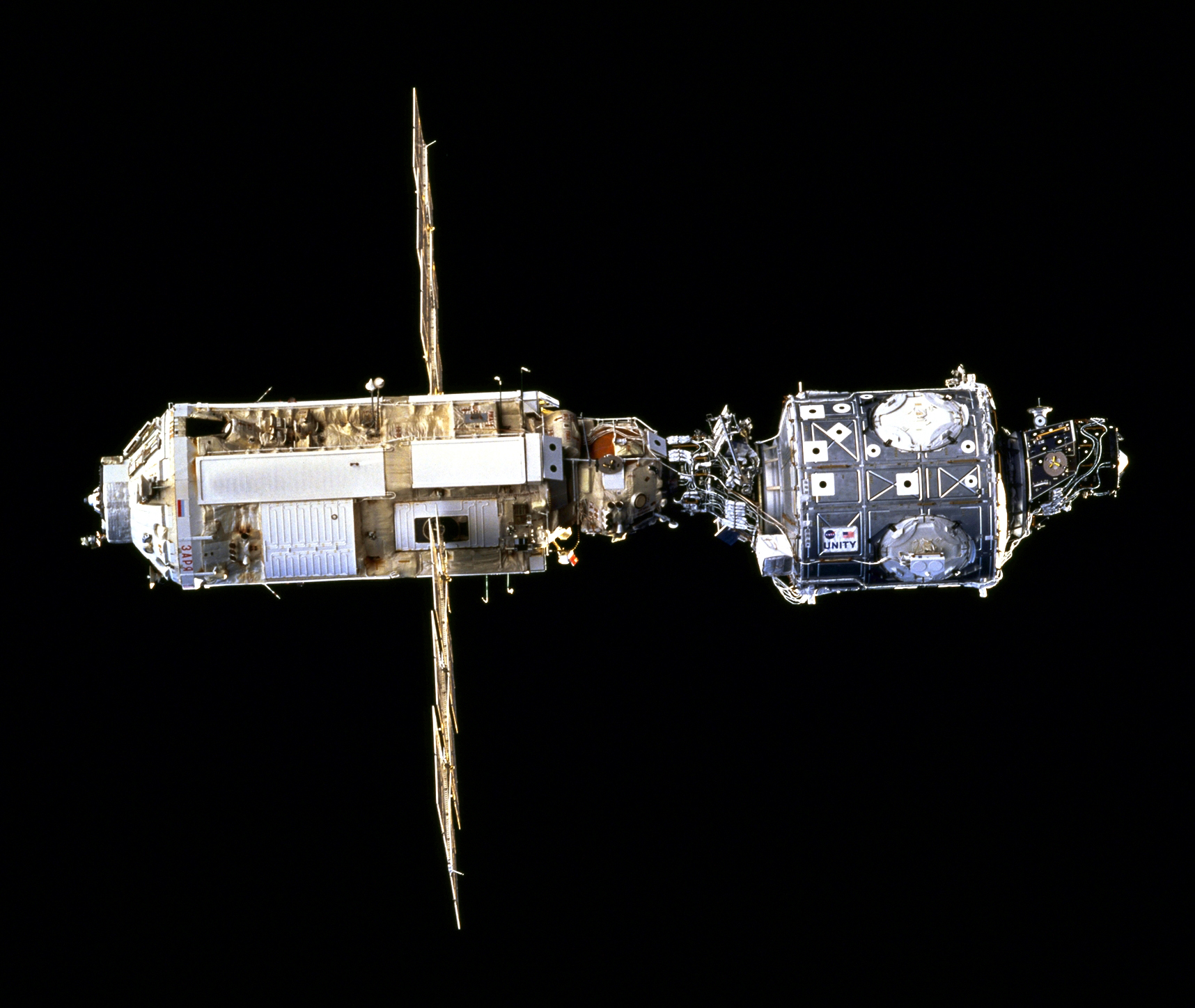
The ISS after STS-88 construction.

Illustration of the International Space Station after STS-88.

Node 1, named Unity, was the first space station hardware delivered by the Space Shuttle. It has two Pressurized Mating Adapters (PMA), one attached to either end. One PMA (PMA-1) is permanently mated to Zarya, and the other (PMA-2) is used for spacecraft dockings and crew access to the station. Unity also contains an International Standard Payload Rack used to support on-orbit activities, which was activated after the fifth Shuttle/Station assembly flight.

To begin the assembly sequence, the crew conducted a series of rendezvous maneuvers similar to those conducted on other Shuttle missions to reach the orbiting FGB. On the way, Currie used the Shuttle's robot arm to place Node 1 atop the Orbiter Docking System. Cabana completed the rendezvous by flying Endeavour to within 10 metres (33 ft) of the FGB, allowing Currie to capture the FGB with the robot arm and place it on the Node's Pressurized Mating Adapter.

Once the two elements were docked, Ross and Newman conducted two scheduled spacewalks to connect power and data cables between the Node, PMAs and the FGB. The day following the spacewalks, Endeavour undocked from the two components, completing the first Space Station assembly mission.

Endeavour's astronauts toured the new International Space Station on Thursday, 10 December 1998, entering the Unity and Zarya modules for the first time, and establishing an S-band communications system that enables U.S. flight controllers to monitor the outpost's systems. Reflecting the international cooperation involved in building the largest space complex in history, Commander Robert Cabana and Russian Cosmonaut Sergei Krikalev opened the hatch to the U.S.-built Unity connecting module and floated into the new station together.

The rest of the crew followed and began turning on lights and unstowing gear in the roomy hub to which other modules would be connected in the future. Each passageway within Unity was marked by a sign leading the way into tunnels to which new modules would later be connected.

About an hour later, Robert Cabana and Sergei Krikalev opened the hatch to the Russian-built Zarya control module, which was the nerve center for the station in its embryonic stage. Joined by Pilot Frederick Sturckow and Mission Specialists Jerry Ross, James H. Newman and Nancy Currie, Cabana and Krikalev hailed the historic entrance into the International Space Station and said the hatch opening signified the start of a new era in space exploration.

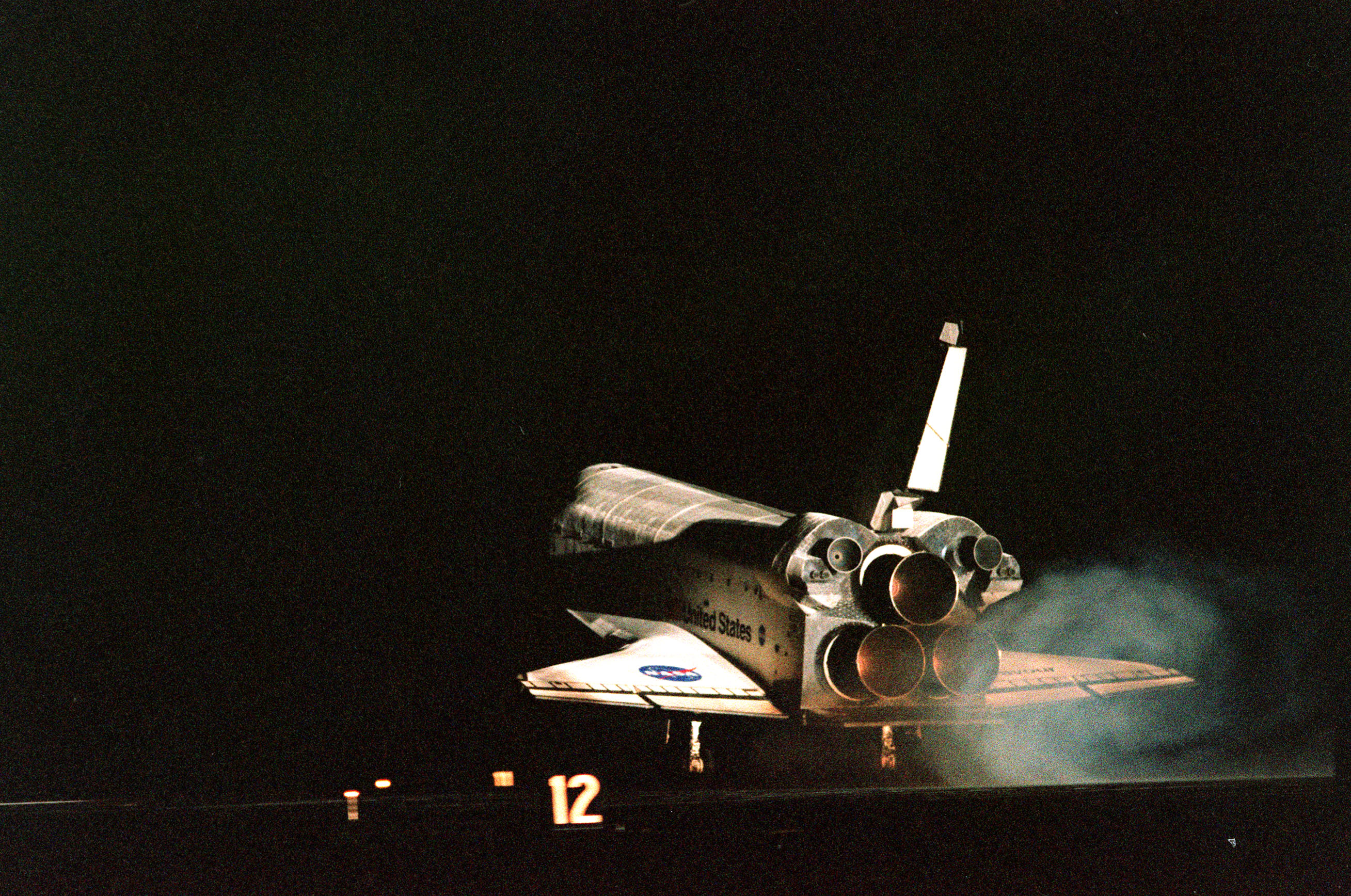
STS-88 lands at the Shuttle Landing Facility, 15 December 1998.

Ross and Newman went right to work in Unity, completing the assembly of an early S-band communications system that allows flight controllers in Houston to send commands to Unity's systems and to keep tabs on the health of the station with a more extensive communications capability than exists through Russian ground stations. The astronauts also conducted a successful test of the videoconferencing capability of the early communications system, which was used by the first crew to permanently occupy the station in November 2000 (Expedition 1). Newman downlinked greetings to controllers in the station flight control room in Houston and to astronaut Bill Shepherd, who commanded the first crew and lived aboard the station with Krikalev and Cosmonaut Yuri Gidzenko.

Krikalev and Currie replaced a faulty unit in Zarya which controlled the discharging of stored energy from one of the module's six batteries. The battery had not been working properly in its automatic configuration, but the new unit was functioning normally shortly after it was installed.

The astronauts also unstowed hardware and logistical supplies stored behind panels in Zarya, relocating the items for use by the Shuttle crew that was to visit the station in May 1999 and by Shepherd's expedition crew. The astronauts also completed their initial outfitting of the station.

The hatches to Zarya and Unity were closed before Endeavour undocked from the new station, leaving the new complex to orbit the Earth unpiloted.

== Mission timeline ==
=== Launch preparations ===
At 12:15 am EST on Monday, 23 June 1997, an Air Force C-5 air cargo plane arrived at the Shuttle Landing Facility carrying Unity (Node 1). On 1 February 1998, Endeavour was towed to Orbiter Processing Facility Bay 1. On 15 October 1998, Endeavour was moved from Orbiter Processing Facility Bay 1 to the Vehicle Assembly Building. On 21 October 1998, Endeavour was transported atop the Crawler Transporter to Kennedy Space Center's Launch Pad 39A.

=== 3–4 December (Flight Day 1, Launch) ===
Space Shuttle Endeavour launched at 3:35:34 am EST from the Kennedy Space Center's Launch Pad 39A. STS-88 was the first shuttle flight to the International Space Station. After launch, the crew opened the shuttle's payload bay doors, deployed the Ku-Band antenna, and activated the shuttle's Hitchhiker payload. The crew also started preparing for the multiple engine firings that will be performed to bring shuttle Endeavour within the Shuttle Remote Manipulator System's reach of the Zarya FGB. At launch, Zarya was 240 statute miles above the Kennedy Space Center (KSC), and the module was on its 222nd orbit of the Earth since its launch.

=== 4 December (Flight Day 2) ===
On Flight Day 2, the crew of Endeavour performed several tasks to get ready for the docking on Sunday and the extra-vehicular activities (EVA) to be completed on the mission. Nancy Currie conducted a photo survey of Unity and Endeavour's payload bay, using the shuttle's robotic arm, Canadarm. Jerry Ross and Jim Newman checked out the spacesuits they would use on the three EVAs and prepared the shuttle's airlock for use during the spacewalks. Rick Sturckow, who would be choreographing the EVAs from inside the shuttle, joined Ross and Newman to check out the SAFER units to be worn during the spacewalks in case Ross or Newman were to become separated from Endeavour during one of the spacewalks.

=== 5 December (Flight Day 3) ===
On Flight Day 3, Currie used Canadarm to grapple and place Unity onto the Orbiter Docking System at 6:45 pm EST. The crew pressurized PMA-2 and entered it. They put several caps over vent valves to prepare for the entrance into Unity later in the week. Commander Bob Cabana performed a debris avoidance maneuver to move Endeavour out of the way of a casing from a Delta II rocket that launched on 6 November from Vandenberg Air Force Base in California.

=== 6 December (Flight Day 4, Docking with Zarya) ===
On Flight Day 4, Bob Cabana fired Endeavour's rockets several times to maneuver the shuttle within Canadarm's reach of the Zarya FGB. At 6:47 pm EST, Currie grappled Zarya. Later, at 9:07 pm EST, Cabana fired Endeavour's downward jets to bring the two modules together.

=== 7 December (Flight Day 5, EVA 1) ===
During a 7-hour, 21-minute spacewalk, astronauts Jerry Ross and Jim Newman helped activate the Unity node, the first module to the U.S. segment of the International Space Station. They connected 40 connectors and cables running along the 35-ton, 76-foot-tall (23 m) space station. At 10:49 pm EST, flight controllers in Houston saw Unity's systems come on.

=== 8 December (Flight Day 6) ===
On the 6th day of Endeavour's STS-88 mission, Mission Specialists Jerry Ross and Jim Newman relaxed after their long spacewalk on Flight Day 5. Ross, Newman, Nancy Currie, and Sergei Krikalev prepared equipment for Flight Day 7's EVA. Commander Bob Cabana and Pilot Rick Sturckow fired Endeavour's main reaction control system jets for 22 minutes to raise the ISS approximately 5 1/2 statute miles. The crew conducted interviews with ABC News, Discovery Channel, and MSNBC.

=== 9 December (Flight Day 7, EVA 2) ===
At 3:33 pm EST, Mission Specialists Jerry Ross and Jim Newman commenced on a 7-hour, 2-minute EVA to continue the installation of Unity. The two spacewalkers first installed two antennas on the outside of Unity. The astronauts also removed launch restraint pins on the four radial common berthing mechanisms of Unity. They installed covers on Unity's two data relay boxes to protect them from sunlight. Lastly, Newman freed a backup rendezvous system antenna on the Zarya FGB.

=== 10 December (Flight Day 8, Entrance into the ISS) ===
Flight Day 8 was a historic day as the International Space Station was opened for the first time on orbit. At 2:54 pm EST, Commander Bob Cabana and Russian Cosmonaut Sergei Krikalev opened the hatch to the Unity Node of the new International Space Station. The other members of the crew started unstowing gear and turning on the lights. At 4:12 pm EST, Cabana and Krikalev opened the hatch into Zarya. Jerry Ross and Jim Newman assembled a S-band communications system in Unity, and Krikalev and Nancy Currie replaced a problematic battery discharging unit in Zarya.

=== 11 December (Flight Day 9) ===
On Flight Day 9, Pilot Rick Sturckow and Mission Specialist Nancy Currie continued unstowing hardware in Unity. After turning off the lights, the crew later closed the hatches to Zarya and Unity. The crew prepared for the mission's third and final spacewalk on Flight Day 10. Endeavour's crew also conducted interviews with CNN and CBS News.

=== 12 December (Flight Day 10, EVA 3) ===
At 3:33 pm EST, astronauts Jerry Ross and Jim Newman commenced on a 6-hour, 59-minute EVA to finish the installation of the Unity Node to Zarya. The two stowed tools on the side of Unity to prepare for the spacewalks on STS-96, the next mission to the ISS. Ross also freed another antenna on Zarya, similar to the one Newman freed on EVA-2. The spacewalkers also tested the redesigned SAFER jet packs, to be used in the event an astronaut became separated from the spacecraft during a spacewalk. After the EVA, Pilot Rick Sturckow depressurized the vestibule between Endeavour and PMA-2 to prepare for the undocking of the two spacecraft on Flight Day 11.

=== 13 December (Flight Day 11, Undocking) ===
On Flight Day 11, Space Shuttle Endeavour undocked from the International Space Station. At 3:25 pm EST, Pilot Rick Sturckow backed Endeavour 450 feet (140 m) away from the station and started a nose-forward fly-around of the station, so that the crew could take pictures of the space station. At 4:49 pm EST, Sturckow performed a final separation burn. Later, the crew deployed SAC-A, a small satellite for the Argentinean National Commission of Space Activities.

=== 14 December (Flight Day 12) ===
On the last full day on orbit, the crew deployed a small Air Force satellite called MightySat-1. The crew tested the orbiter's aerosurfaces and steering jets to be used on landing day and stowed equipment.

=== 15 December (Flight Day 13, Landing) ===
Flight Day 13 was landing day for Space Shuttle Endeavour and its crew of six. At 7:07 pm EST, the orbiter's payload bay doors were closed for entry. Flight Director John Shannon gave the go for the crew to fire the orbital maneuvering system engines for the deorbit burn at 9:46 pm EST so that Endeavour could slow down to enter the Earth's atmosphere. At 10:54 pm EST, Endeavour and crew landed on the Kennedy Space Center's Runway 15. Endeavour wrapped up a 4.7 million mile mission, and the first to the International Space Station.

== Extra-vehicular activity ==
Three extra-vehicular activity (EVA) spacewalks were scheduled and completed during STS-88.

	Spacewalkers	Start (UTC)	End (UTC)	Duration	Mission
EVA 1	Jerry L. Ross; James H. Newman	7 December 1998; 22:10	8 December 1998; 05:31	7 hours, 21 minutes	Began Unity installation.
EVA 2	Ross; Newman	9 December 1998; 20:33	10 December 1998; 03:35	7 hours, 02 minutes	Continued Unity installation.
EVA 3	Ross; Newman	12 December 1998; 20:33	13 December 1998; 03:32	6 hours, 59 minutes	Completion of Unity installation.

== Wake-up calls ==
NASA began a tradition of playing music to astronauts during the Gemini program, and first used music to wake up a flight crew during Apollo 15. Each track is specially chosen, often by the astronauts' families, and usually has a special meaning to an individual member of the crew, or is applicable to their daily activities.

Flight Day	Song	Artist	Played for
Day 2	"Get Ready"	The Temptations	
Day 3	"Anchors Aweigh"	Charles A. Zimmermann	
Day 4	"Over the Rainbow"	Judy Garland	Robert D. Cabana
Day 5	"Jerry the Rigger"	old Celtic song	Jerry L. Ross
Day 6	"Streets of Bakersfield"	Dwight Yoakam	Frederick W. Sturckow
Day 7	"Floating in the Bathtub"		James H. Newman
Day 8	"God Bless the U.S.A."	Lee Greenwood	Nancy J. Currie-Gregg
Day 9	"Trepak"	Pyotr Ilyich Tchaikovsky	Sergei Krikalev
Day 10	"Hound Dog"	Elvis Presley	
Day 11	"Goodnite, Sweetheart, Goodnite"	The Spaniels	
Day 12	"I Got You (I Feel Good)"	James Brown	"In honor of the good feelings evoked by this successful first International Space Station Assembly mission."
Day 13	"Ride of the Valkyries"	Richard Wagner	

== Media ==
STS-88 launches from KSC (7 mins 59 secs)

Highlights from the first spacewalk (4 mins 59 secs)

The SAC-A satellite after deployment from the Shuttle

== See also ==
- List of human spaceflights
- List of International Space Station spacewalks
- List of Space Shuttle missions
- List of spacewalks and moonwalks 1965–1999
- Outline of space science
- Space Shuttle
