= Indiglo =

Electroluminescent watch backlight

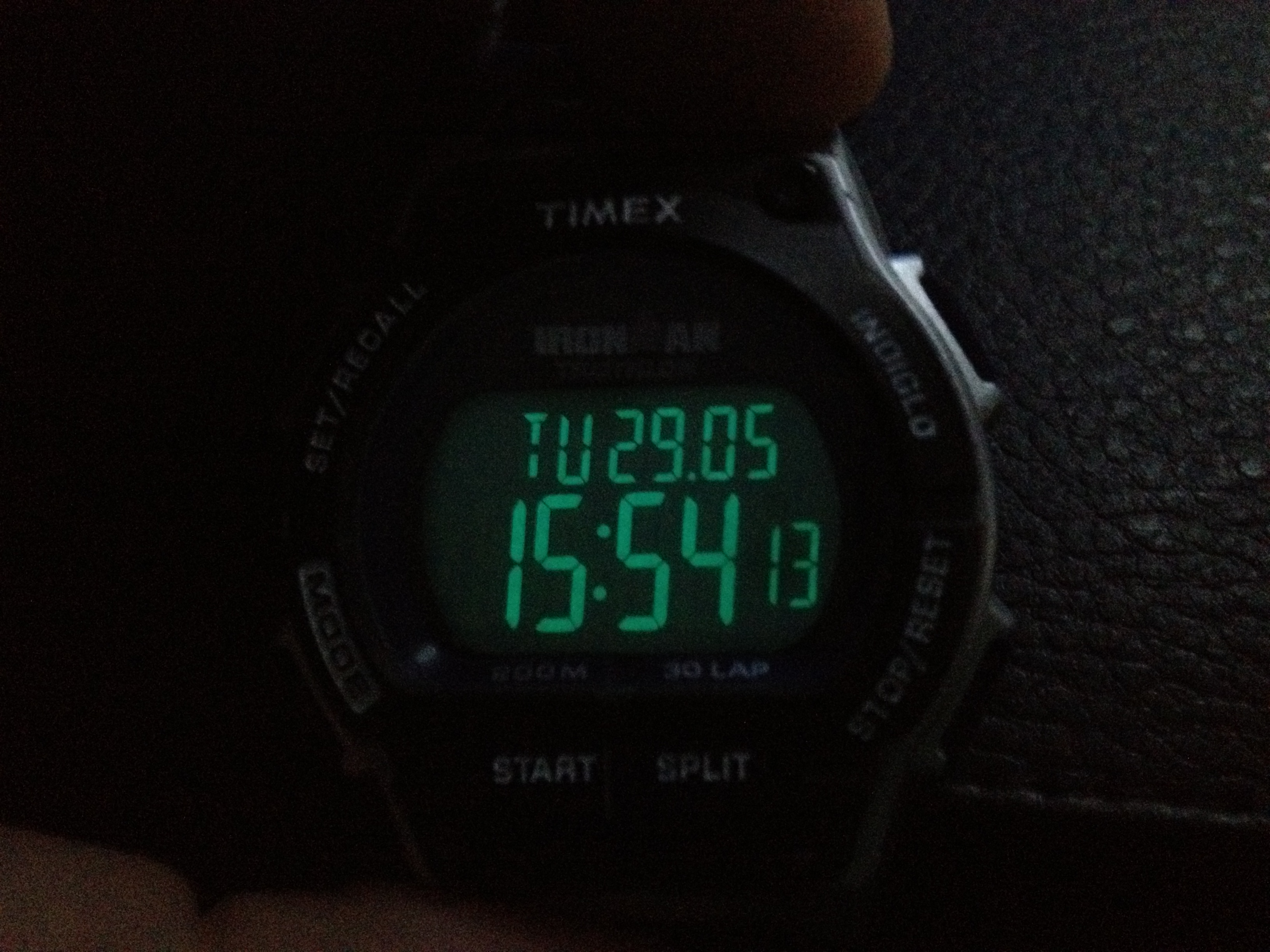
Indiglo feature on a Timex Ironman digital watch with a negative display

Indiglo feature on a Timex Weekender analog watch

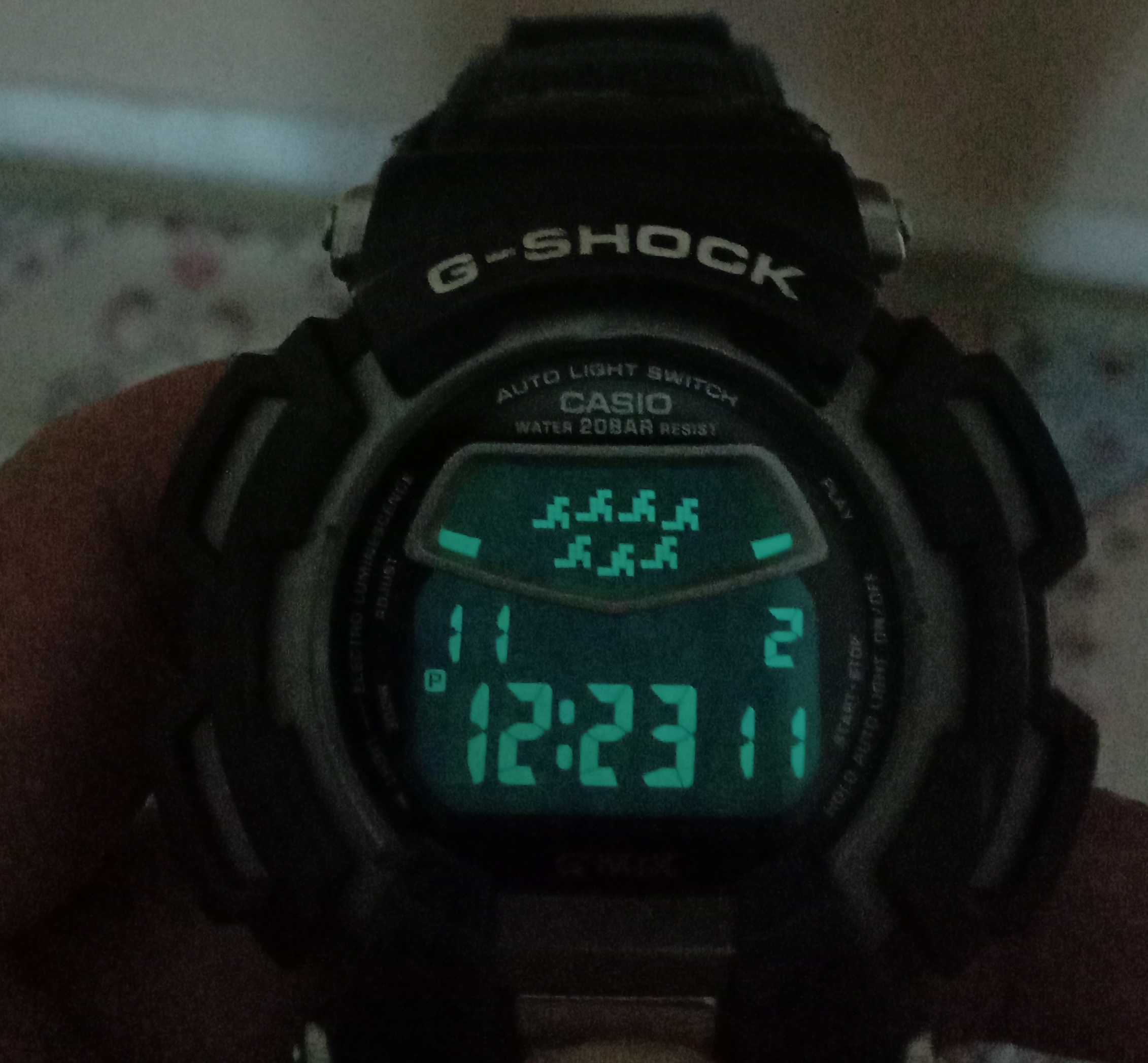
Electroluminescent backlight on a Casio G-Shock watch with a negative display

Indiglo is a product feature on watches marketed by Timex, incorporating an electroluminescent panel as a backlight for even illumination of the watch dial.

The brand is owned by Indiglo Corporation, which is in turn solely owned by Timex, and the name derives from the word indigo, as the original watches featuring the technology emitted a green-blue light.

== History ==
Timex introduced the Indiglo technology in 1992 in their Ironman watch line and subsequently expanded its use to 70% of their watch line, including men's and women's watches, sport watches and chronographs. Casio introduced their version of electroluminescent backlight technology in 1995.

The Indiglo name was later licensed to other companies, such as Austin Innovations Inc., for use on their electroluminescent products.

From 2006 to 2011, the Timex Group marketed a line of high-end quartz watches under the TX Watch Company brand, using a proprietary six-hand, four-motor, micro-processor controlled movement. To separate the brand from Timex, the movements had luxury features associated with a higher-end brand, e.g., sapphire crystals and stainless steel or titanium casework — and used hands treated with super-luminova luminescent pigment for low-light legibility — rather than indiglo technology.

When the Timex Group migrated the microprocessor-controlled, multi-motor, multi-hand technology to its Timex brand in 2012, it created a sub-collection marketed as Intelligent Quartz (IQ). The line employed the same movements and capabilities from the TX brand, at a much lower price-point—incorporating indiglo technology rather than the super-luminova pigments.

== Design ==
Indiglo backlights typically emit a distinct greenish-blue color and evenly light the entire display or dial. Certain Indiglo models, e.g., Timex Datalink USB, use a negative liquid-crystal display so that only the digits are illuminated, rather than the entire display.
