= Giorgio Galli =

Giorgio Galli may refer to:

- Giorgio Galli (footballer) (born 1996), Italian footballer
- Giorgio Galli (historian) (1928–2020), Italian political scientist, historian, and academic
- Giorgio Galli (watchmaker), Milan-based creative director for Timex Group
