= Robert H. Ingersoll =

American businessman (1859-1928)

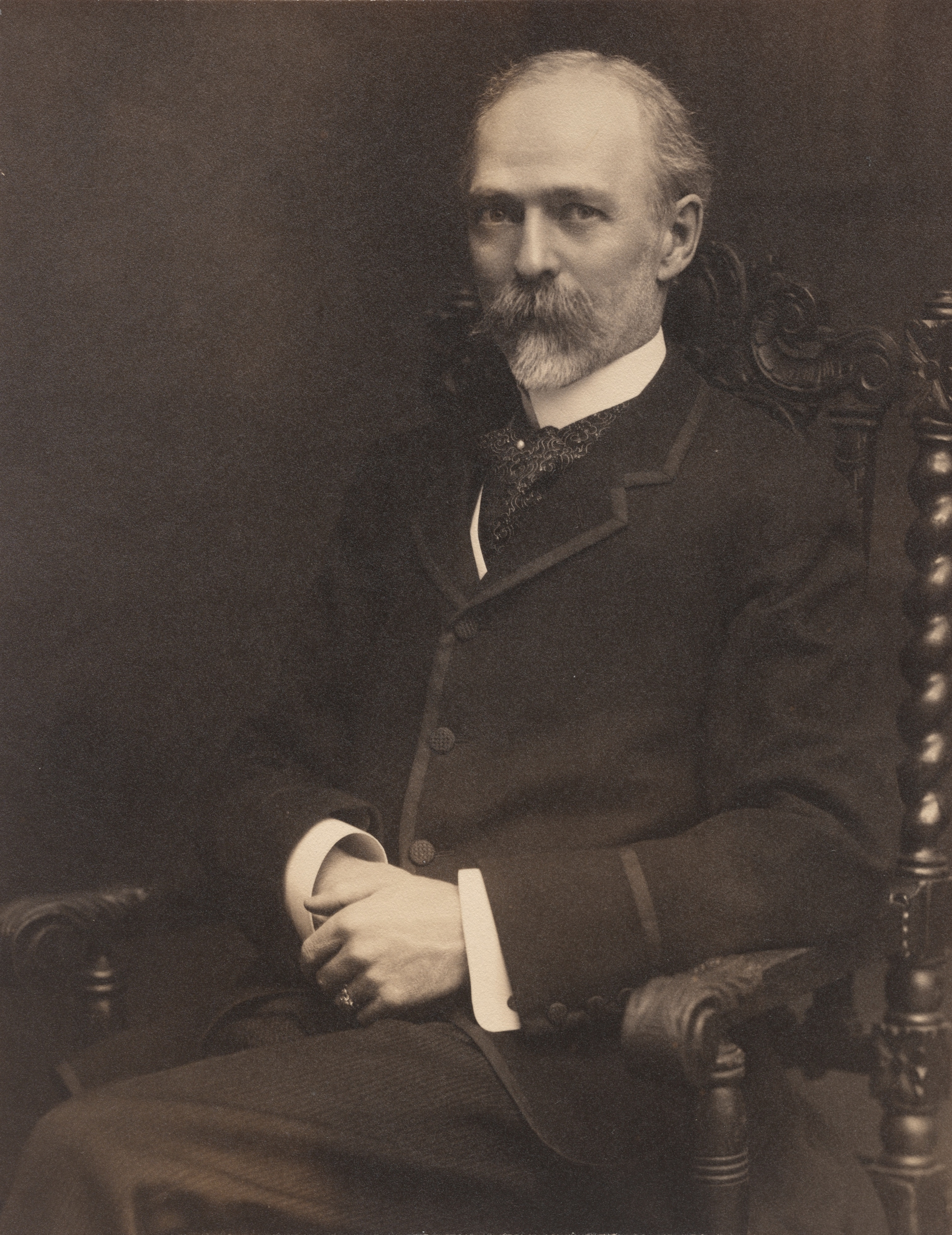
- Ingersoll in 1915
- Born: December 26, 1859; Delta, Michigan
- Died: September 4, 1928 (aged 68); Denver, Colorado, U.S.
- Occupation: Businessman
- Known for: Co-founding the Ingersoll Watch Company; Producing the first "dollar watch"

Robert Hawley Ingersoll (December 26, 1859 — September 4, 1928) was an American businessman known for founding the Ingersoll Watch Company with his brother Charles and producing the "dollar watch", the first inexpensive, mass-produced pocket watch.

== Biography ==
Robert H. Ingersoll was born on December 26, 1859, in Delta, Michigan, to Orville Boudinot Ingersoll and Mary Elizabeth Beers.

Robert moved to New York City in 1879 and entered the employment of his brother Howard, making and selling rubber stamps. In 1880 Robert opened his own wholesale business, also selling rubber stamps. In 1881 he was joined by his brother Charles Henry Ingersoll (1865–1948).

The first Ingersoll watches, called "Universal" were introduced in 1892, supplied by the Waterbury Clock Company. In 1896 Ingersoll introduced a watch called the Yankee, setting its price at $1. This made it the cheapest watch available at the time, and the first watch to be priced at one dollar: the "dollar watch".

William H. Ingersoll was later a partner in the business.

On June 22, 1904, in Muskegon, Michigan, he married Roberta Maria Bannister.

Ingersoll bought the bankrupt New England Watch Company in 1914 and renamed it the Ingersoll Watch Company.

The company went bankrupt in 1921 after over-expansion during World War I. Its assets were sold to the Waterbury Clock Company, the predecessor of the modern day Timex Group USA.

His wife was involved in an attempted murder-suicide in 1926 when she shot her lover and then took her own life with a gunshot to her breast.

Ingersoll died on September 4, 1928, in Denver, Colorado.
