= Timexpo Museum =

Coordinates: 41.552°N 73.0351°W

Timexpo
- Museum logo

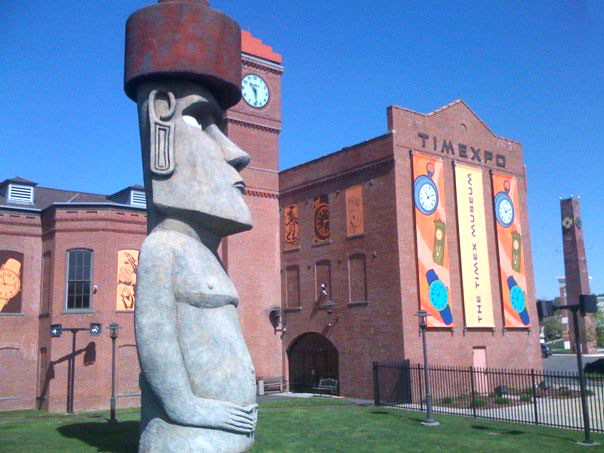
- Timexpo Museum Exterior with Moai statue
- Established: 2001
- Dissolved: 2015
- Location: 175 Union Street, Waterbury, Connecticut, United States
- Type: History museum, horology museum
- Owner: Timex Group USA, Inc.

The Timexpo Museum in Waterbury, Connecticut was dedicated to the history of Timex Group and its predecessors, featuring exhibits dating to the founding of Waterbury Clock Company in 1854. The museum was located in the Brass Mill Commons shopping center with its location marked by a 40-foot (12 m) high replica of an Easter Island Moai statue which connected with the museum's archaeology exhibit. The museum covered 14,000 square feet (1,300 m^{2}) with 8,000 square feet (740 m^{2}) dedicated to the two main exhibits: the company's history of timepieces and archaeology.

For decades, Waterbury has been known as the Brass Capital, despite a decline in manufacturing over time. The building that housed the museum was the former executive office of the Scovill Manufacturing Company and Century Brass Company, and is the only remaining building of the 44-acre (180,000 m^{2}) brass mill complex. Timex Group owed its origins to the Waterbury brass industry when the original clock company began in 1854 as a division of brass manufacturer Benedict & Burnham – a local competitor to Scovill. Waterbury Clock was spun off and incorporated on March 27, 1857 due to its success.

The museum focused on important events in Timex Group history, including an exhibit on the U.S. Army commissioning Waterbury Clock Company in 1917 to provide wristwatch versions of the Ingersoll Ladies Midget pocketwatch for soldiers heading overseas. It included aspects of local history, including letters from Mark Twain, who lived for a time in nearby Hartford, as well as exhibits concerning the travels of settlers across the Atlantic and Pacific Oceans based on the explorations of Thor Heyerdahl.

The museum was approved in 1999 and opened in May 2001. Museum costs were estimated at $4.8 million, with the Naugatuck Valley Development Corporation providing approximately $500,000 and Timex funding the rest.

The final cost was $5.45 million, including $2 million from the Naugatuck Valley Development Corporation and the Connecticut Department of Economic Development and Community Development.

The museum closed at the end of September, 2015, because of low attendance.

== See also ==
- American Clock & Watch Museum in Bristol, Connecticut
- Timex Group USA
- American clock
- Chauncey Jerome
