= Mount Hebron Cemetery (Montclair, New Jersey) =

Cemetery in Essex County, New Jersey

Coordinates: 40.855°N 74.198°W

Mount Hebron Cemetery is a cemetery in Montclair, in Essex County, New Jersey, United States. Founded in February 1863 by citizens of Cranetown and Speertown (now Montclair and Upper Montclair), the Mount Hebron Cemetery features 30 acres of landscaped grounds. There are numerous entombment areas including a vintage receiving vault that is no longer in use. The Chime Tower near the main entrance can be used at any service to provide appropriate mood.

== Notable interments ==
- Shirley Booth (1898–1992), Academy Award-winning actress for the film Come Back, Little Sheba
- Allen B. Du Mont (1901–1965), scientist and inventor best known for improvements to the cathode ray tube in 1931 for use in television receivers, manufacture of the first commercially successful electronic televisions and founder of the first licensed TV network, DuMont Television Network
- Olympia Dukakis (1931–2021), actress
- Edward Sylvester Ellis (1840–1916), author
- Bayard Hilton Faulkner (1894–1983), mayor of Montclair
- Albert W. Hawkes (1878–1971), US Senator from New Jersey from 1943–1949
- Herman Hupfeld (1894–1951), songwriter whose most notable composition was "As Time Goes By" in the film Casablanca
- Charles Henry Ingersoll (1865–1948), Ingersoll Watch Company co-founder
- Vincent La Selva (1929–2017), conductor
- Reggie Lucas (1953–2018), musician, songwriter, record producer
- John Raleigh Mott (1865-1955), Nobel Peace Price winner (cenotaph)
- William Staub (1915–2012), inventor and developer
- Louis Zorich (1924–2018), actor
