= Timex Ironman =

Digital wristwatch by Timex

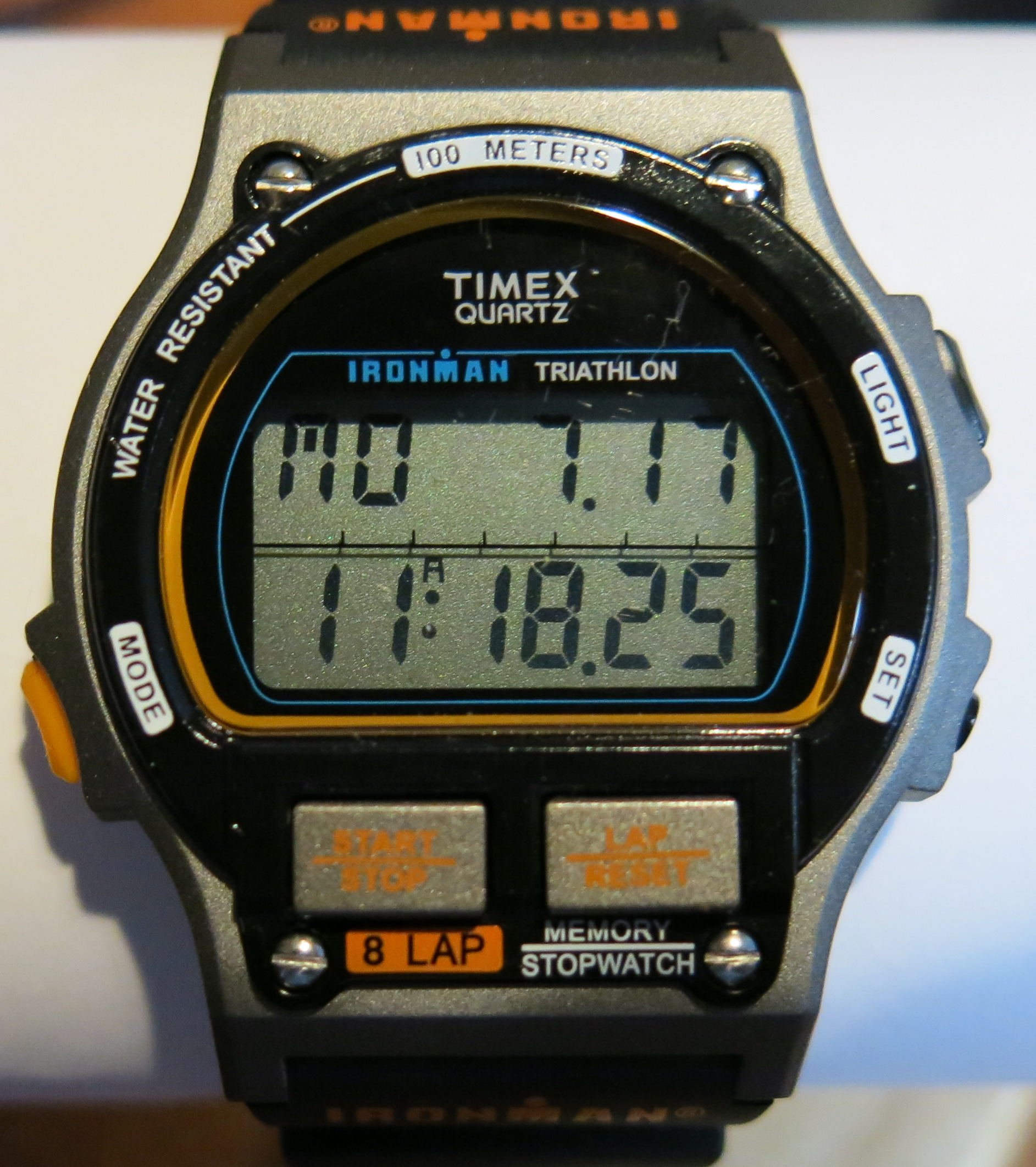
1st Generation Timex Ironman Watch - Released in 1986

The Timex Ironman is a digital wristwatch first produced by Timex in 1986, and continues to be made in various styles today.

== History and development ==
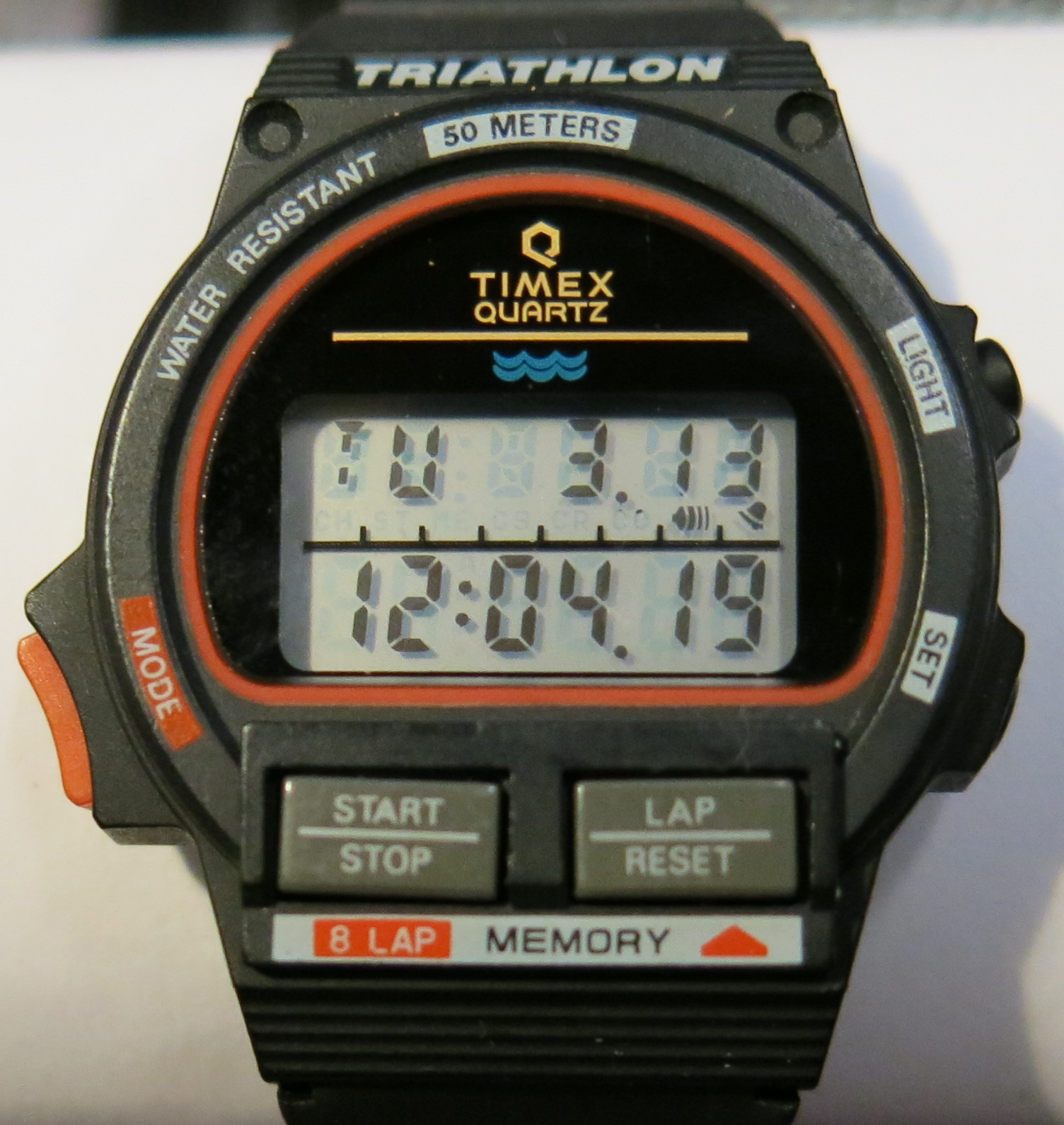
Original Timex Triathlon Watch from 1984, precursor to the Ironman series of watches

In 1984, Timex worked together with the officials of the Ironman Triathlon sporting event to develop a new digital watch focused on the needs of triathletes. The result was the Timex Triathlon. Timex was a sponsor of the Hawaii Ironman Triathlon, and they hoped that this new digital product would improve sales. Timex’s product manager for digital launches, Mario Sabatini, flew to Kona in October, 1984 to get a feel for the market. He took 1500 Timex Triathlon watches with him to sell to athletes. The watches were priced at $34.95 (equivalent to $108 in 2025), and all were sold at the event. After a $20 million advertising campaign featuring toughness tests performed on the watch, the Triathlon became a success.

In 1986, Timex acquired the rights to the Ironman name, and developed the Ironman Triathlon watch based on the 1984 Timex Triathlon watch. Famed industrial designer John T. Houlihan oversaw the design of both the Triathlon and the Ironman. The basic functions and design were the same as its Triathlon cousin, except that the Ironman was water resistant to 100 meters instead of 50, given an updated look with a black, orange and grey color scheme on the watch face, and the 19mm ribbed wrist strap was adorned with the Ironman name and 3 stylized "M" logos. The pewter or metallic gray like color of 1986's Ironman original case was coated with Dupont automotive paint which was inspired by a car parked at Timex's office in Cupertino (no longer extant, adjacent to the site of Apple's present HQ).

Sales for the new watch grew rapidly; although both models continued in production with minimal changes through 1991, Ironman sales far exceeded those of the earlier Triathlon watch.

The Ironman Watch included time, stopwatch (chrono), timer, hourly chime, and three alarms. The first generation Ironman watches were commonly used by military and law enforcement personnel. A mid-sized, ladies/youth version of the watch was released the same year as the original. The original 1984 Triathlon and 1986 Ironman (full-size/midsize) watches remained in production until 1991, when the first of many cosmetic and design refreshes came along. This era of Timex Ironman is now known amongst watch collectors as the "Pre Indiglo" Ironman. An all-metal version of the Ironman was produced for a while in the 1990s and early 2000s. It featured a chrome plated brass case with a stainless steel screw down caseback.

== Indiglo technology ==
In 1992, the Ironman got its first major technology update since its introduction six years earlier, with a new Indiglo electroluminescence technology to replace the mini white corner backlight. Initial models of the Indiglo Ironmans were based on the same 1986 design, except they were painted black and silver, given a different wrist strap and were available exclusively at K-Mart before expanding into the market in early 1993. The original 1986 color scheme Ironman would get the Indiglo backlight at this time, as did the Silver/Stainless steel full-size version. The ladies/midsize Ironman would not get the Indiglo technology until 1994. In 1996, Indiglo/TIMEX developed a reflective blue-green or "all-day Indiglo" for its Ironman and other digital watches. This reflective technology has since been adopted by other watchmakers and has seemingly been abandoned by Timex as evident in newer (post 2005) releases of its Ironman and other digital watches as they no longer have the reflective screens.

The Timex Ironman continues to be Timex's best-selling brand. It has been updated over the years, with examples including the Timex Datalink Ironman.

== A presidential watch ==
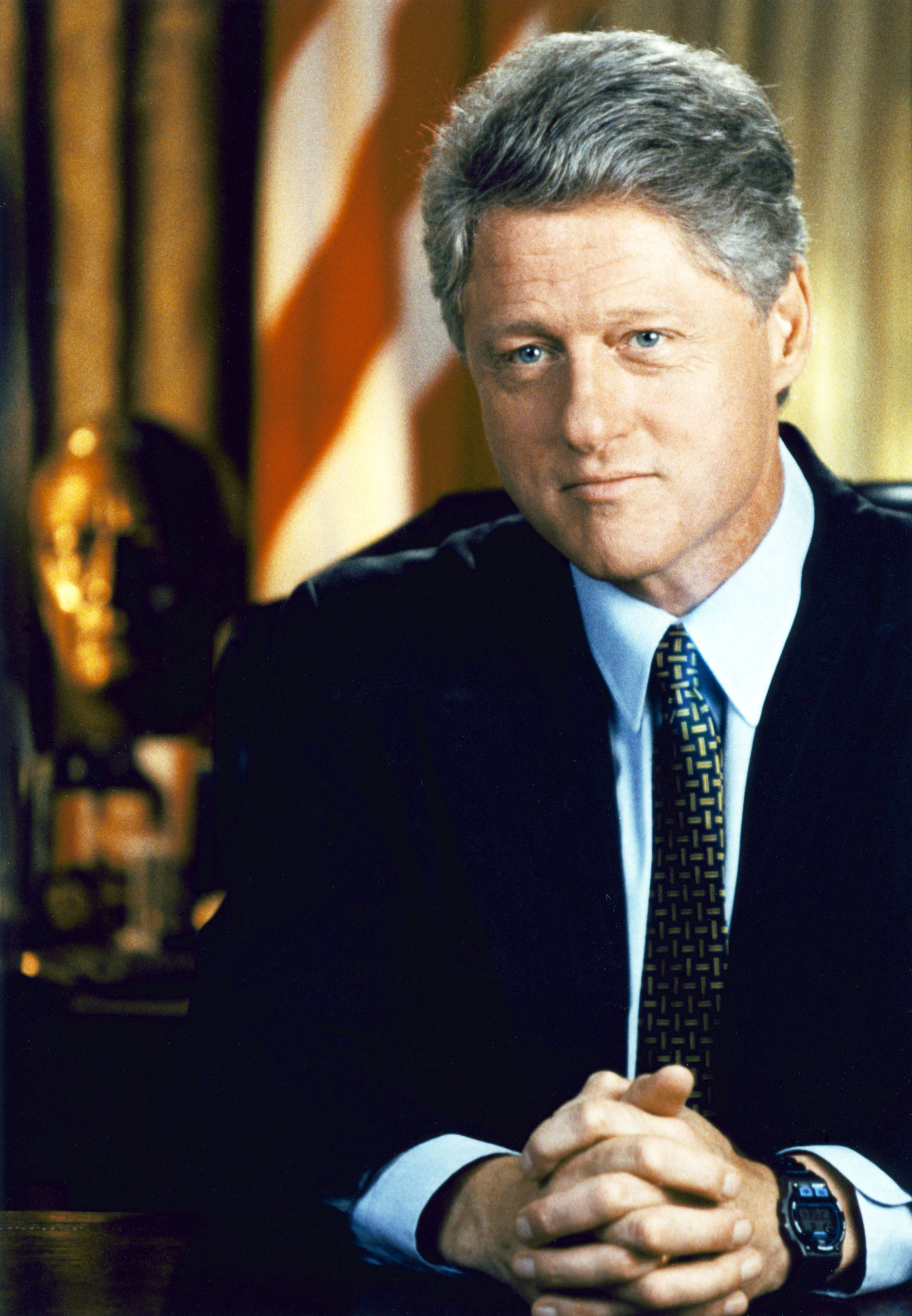
Bill Clinton wearing the Ironman

U.S. President Bill Clinton owned and wore several early models (including the original) of the Timex Ironman watch during his time as governor of Arkansas and in the early years of his presidency. In his early presidential photographs and at his 1993 inauguration and inaugural ball, he is seen wearing a blue and black Ironman Triathlon. Clinton's forgoing of a more presidential watch such as a Rolex earned him some criticism; Gene Weingarten of the Washington Post described Clinton's timepiece derisively as "a plastic digital watch, thick as a brick, and handsome as a hernia", while Omega SA ran ads in 1992 suggesting that Clinton should give up the Timex in favor of something more expensive. Clinton stopped wearing his Ironman publicly in 1994, starting with the 50th anniversary of D-Day. Clinton has since donated one of his early Ironman models to the Smithsonian.

== Gallery ==
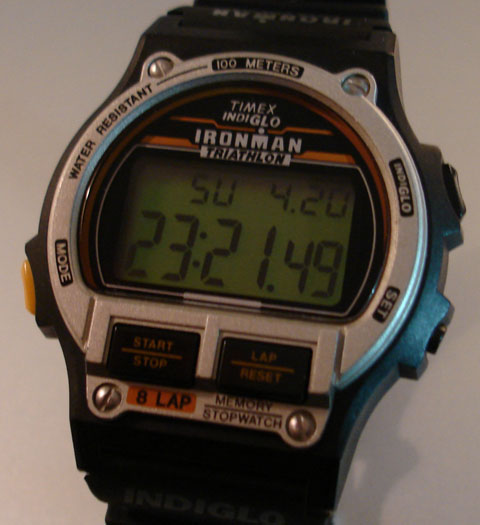
Timex Ironman 20th anniversary watch

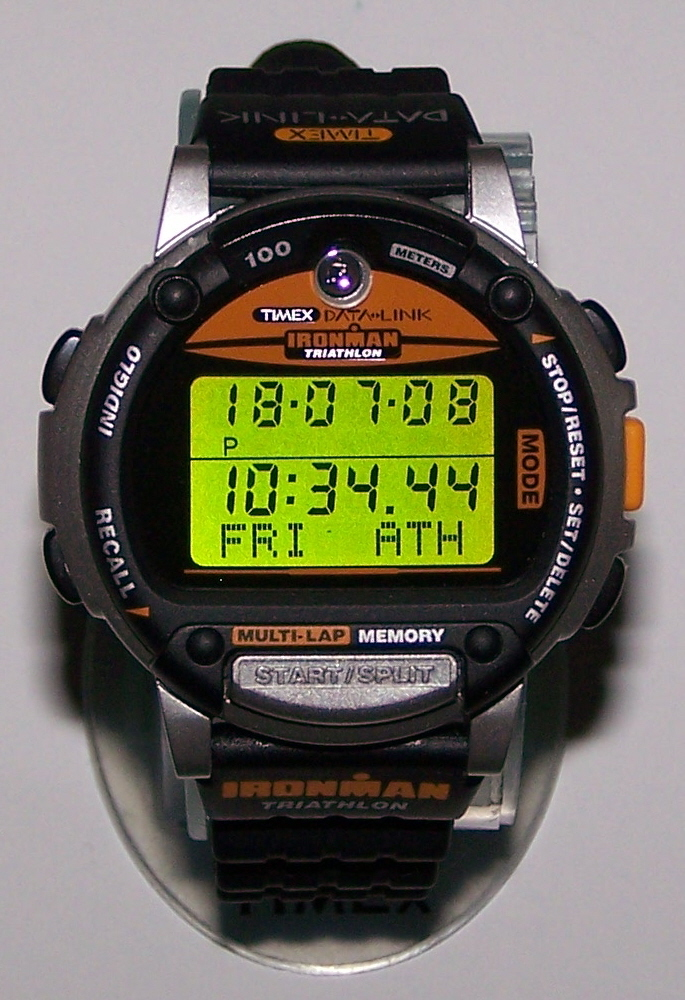
Timex Ironman Triathlon Datalink

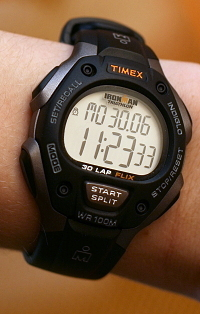
Timex T5E901 Ironman Triathlon 30 Lap FLIX

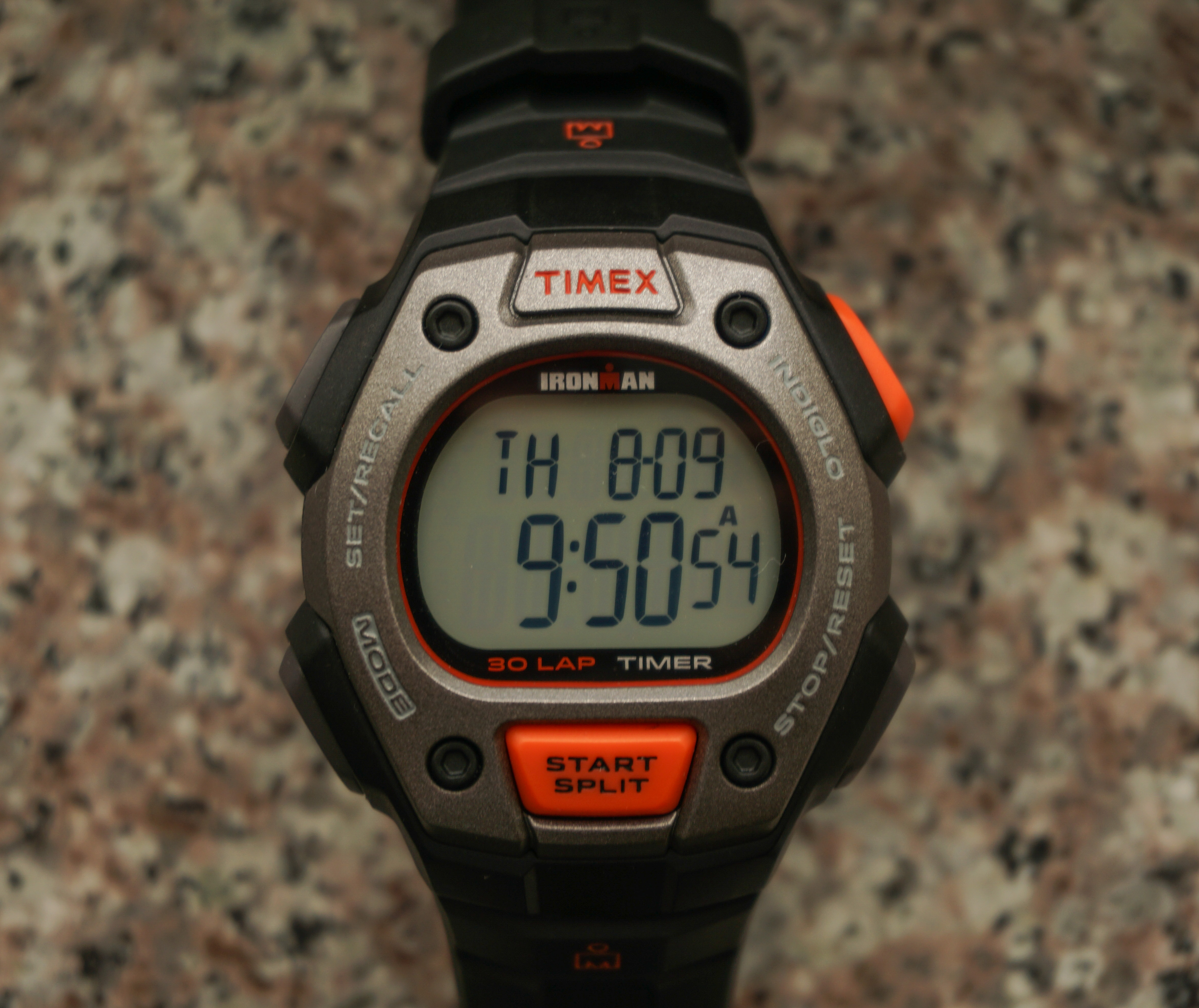
Modern example of Timex Ironman with Indiglo technology
