= American Clock & Watch Museum =

Coordinates: 41.6794°N 72.9411°W

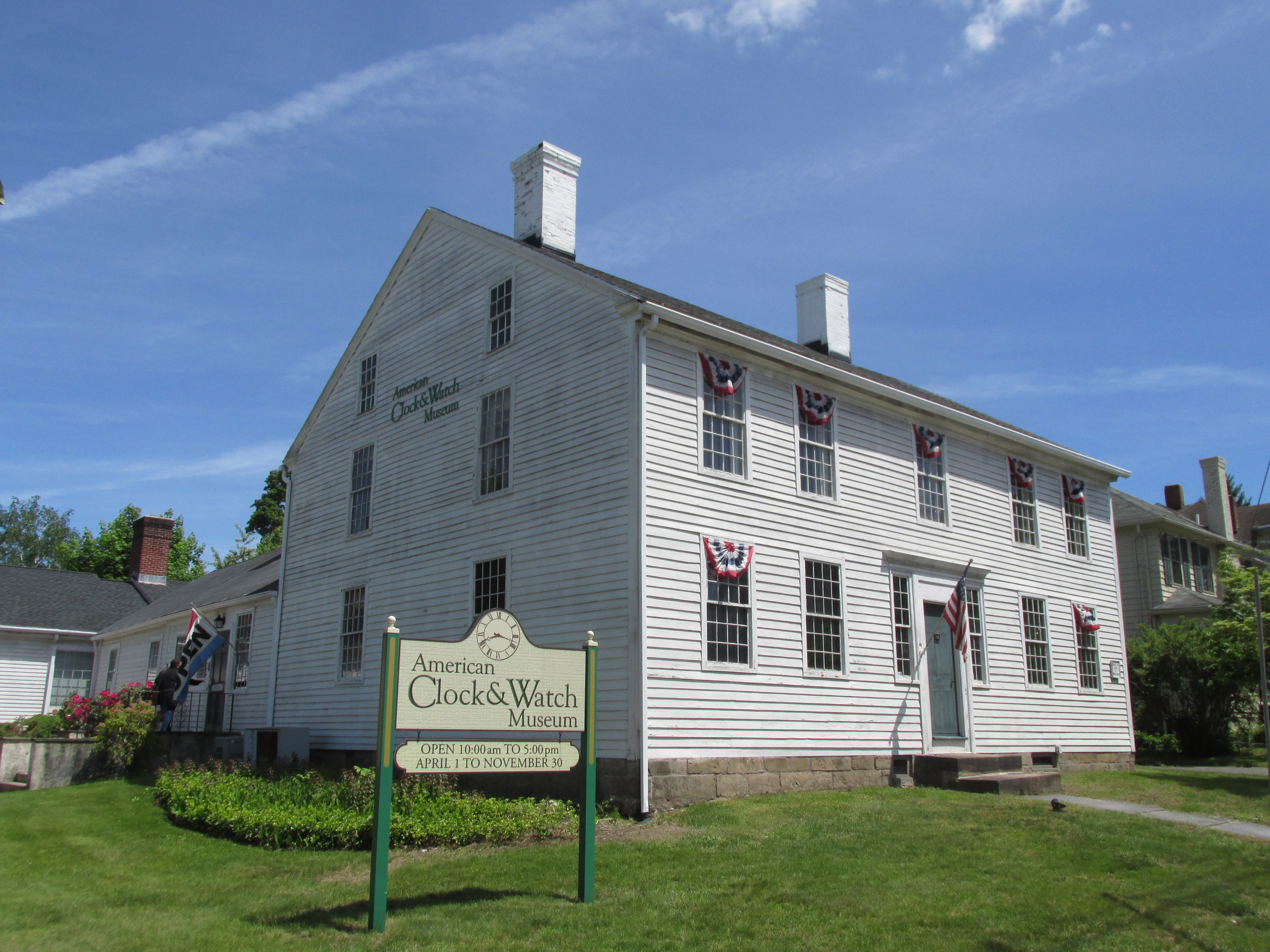
- Location: 100 Maple Street; Bristol, Connecticut, United States
- Type: Horology museum
- Website: www.clockandwatchmuseum.org

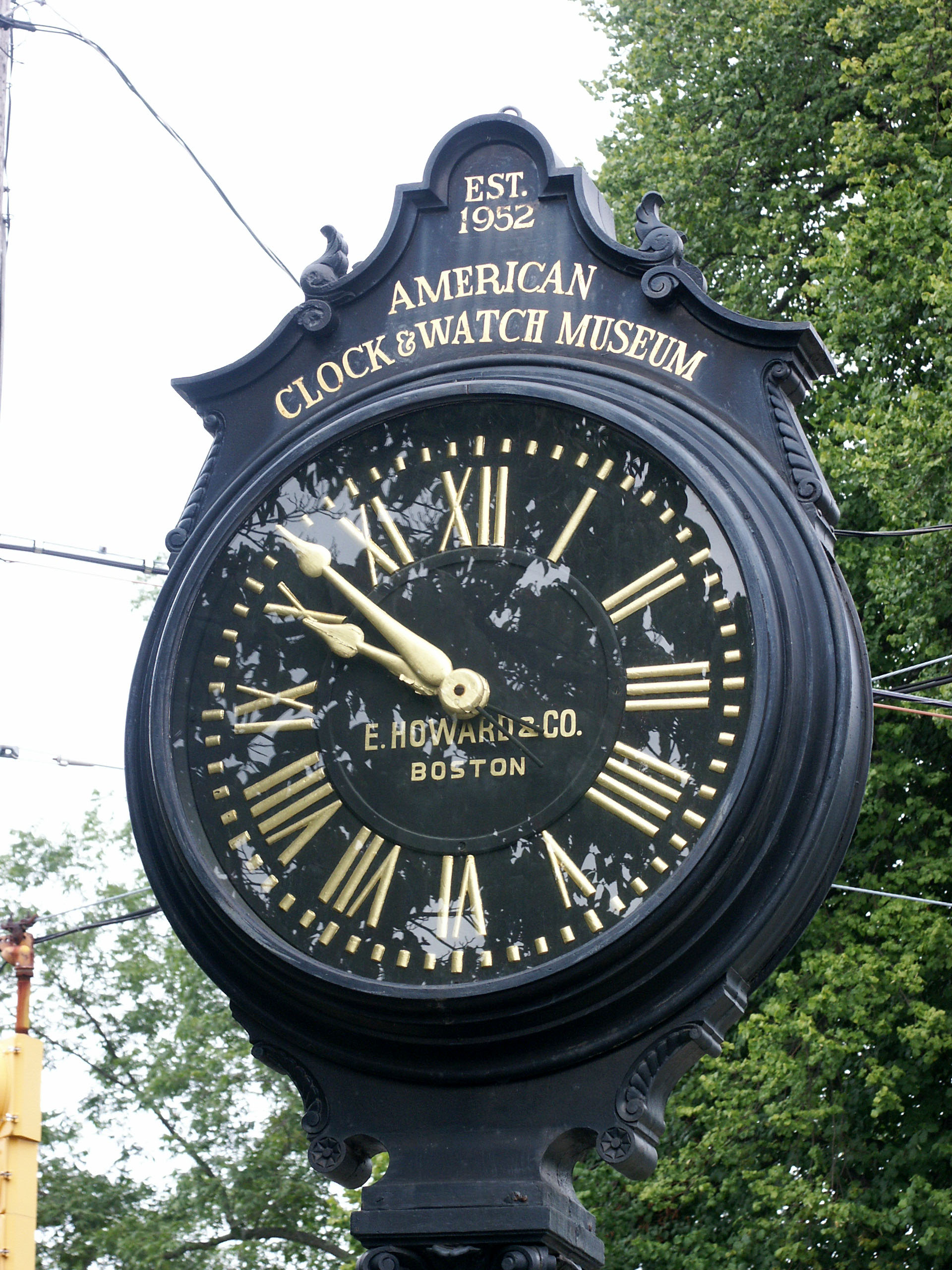
Street clock at the museum.

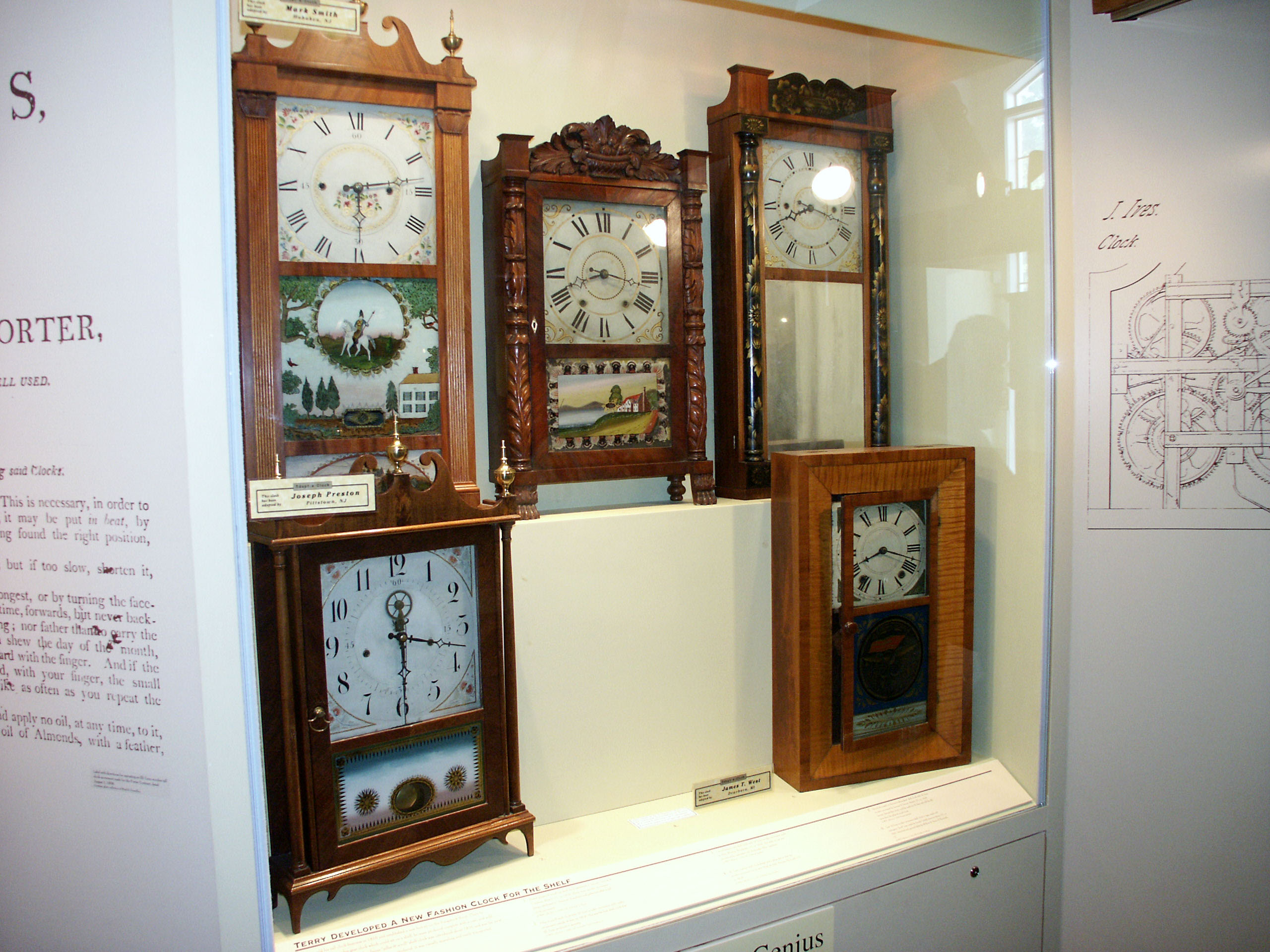
Display of Connecticut-made shelf clocks by various manufacturers.

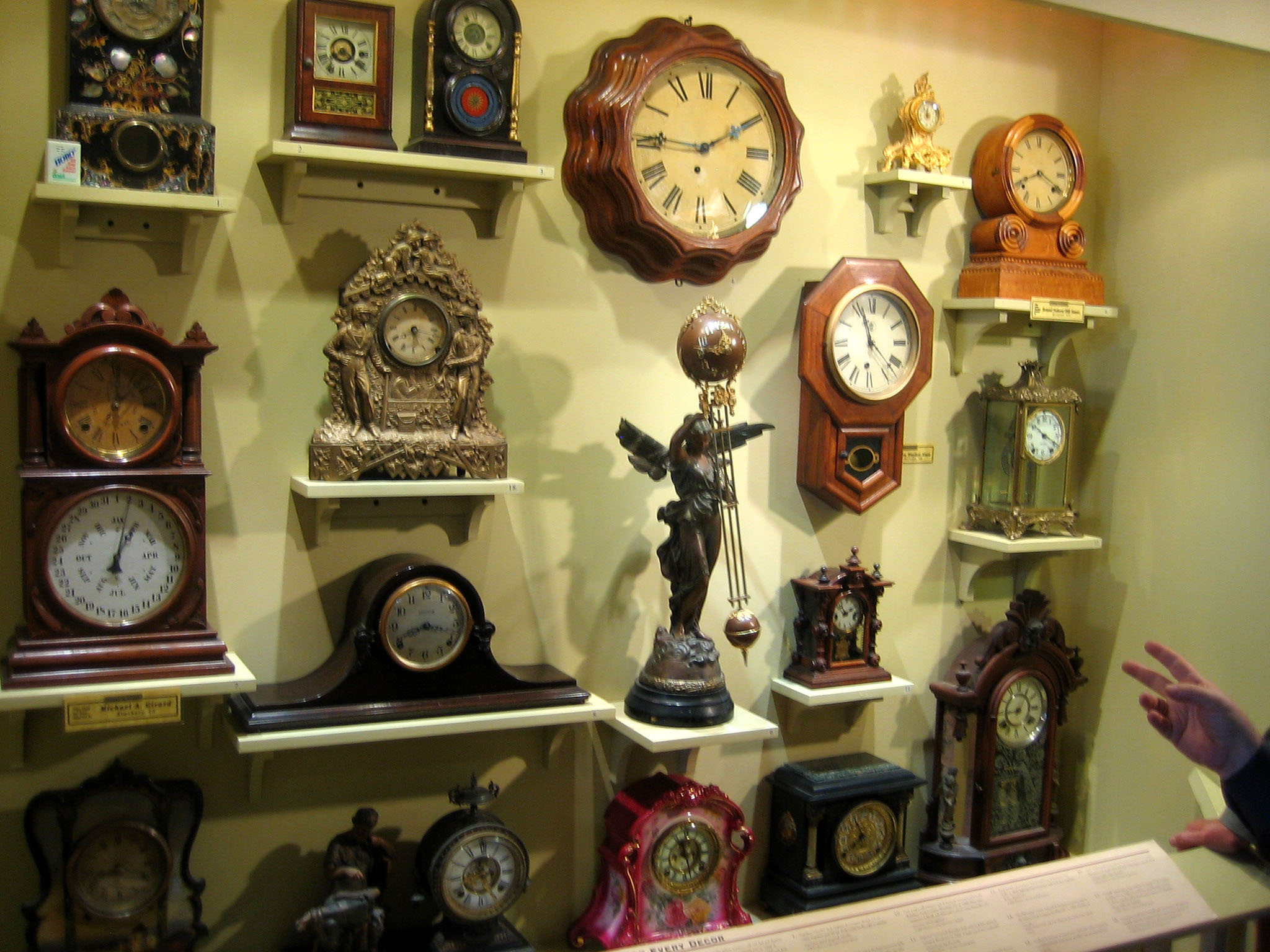
General display of various styles of American-made clocks by various manufacturers.

The American Clock & Watch Museum (ACWM), located in Bristol, Connecticut, is one of a very few museums in the United States dedicated solely to horology, which is the history, science and art of timekeeping and timekeepers. Located in the heart of the historic center of American clockmaking, ACWM is the world's preeminent horological museum in the area of American clocks, primarily industrial-made clocks of the 19th and early 20th century.

The museum is located in a complex including the historic Miles Lewis residence, the partially relocated historic 1728 Barnes homestead, and a modern extension wing in the town of Bristol, Connecticut, the hometown of the former Ingraham and Sessions clock companies. Bristol is located north of Interstate Highway 84, about 30 minutes west of Hartford CT or two hours from New York City.

The ACWM is an independent educational institution, operating under Section 501c3 of the Internal Revenue Code, and besides a small professional staff relies on volunteers for much of its manpower and support. Originally known as The Bristol Clock Museum, the institution was started in 1952 and acquired its site the next year.

== Exhibits ==
The exhibits include clocks (and some watches) from all periods and countries, but the focus of the exhibits is clearly on American clocks. A substantial part of the exhibit space is devoted to tell the story of Eli Terry and his successors and imitators. Terry pioneered mass manufacturing techniques in the early 19th century by replacing the traditional system of making one clock at a time with handmade parts each adjusted to fit with each other, to using a system of machine-made interchangeable parts, with close enough tolerances that they could be assembled without further adjustment. Connecticut clockmaking, together with American firearm manufacturing, helped launch the Industrial Revolution.

== Library ==
The ACWM has a significant horological research library, that includes a particularly rich collection of historic catalogs of American clock brands. The library is open for horological researchers only by prior arrangement.

== See also ==
- Horology

== Similar museums ==
- Deutsches Uhrenmuseum
- Irish Museum of Time
- National Watch and Clock Museum
- Mussee Internationale d'Horlogerie
- Timexpo Museum in Waterbury, Connecticut (closed)
- Willard House and Clock Museum
- Charles River Museum of Industry
- The Waltham Museum, Inc
