= Timex Group =

American-Dutch holding company

Timex Group B.V.
- Type: Privately held
- Industry: Watch manufacturing, luxury goods
- Headquarters: Middlebury, Connecticut, U.S.; Hoofddorp, Netherlands
- Owners: Baupost Group
- Number of employees: 5,000+
- Website: timexgroup.com

Timex Group B.V., or Timex Group, is an American–Dutch holding company headquartered in Hoofddorp, the Netherlands and Middlebury, Connecticut. It is the corporate parent of several global watchmaking companies including Timex Group USA, Inc., TMX Philippines, Inc., and Timex Group India Ltd. In 2020, the Boston-based investment firm Baupost Group took ownership of Timex Group.

== Name ==
Shortly after purchasing the Waterbury Clock Company in 1941, Norwegian founder Thomas Olsen renamed the company Timex, as a portmanteau of Time (referring to Time magazine) and Kleenex.

== Companies and brands ==
Timex Business Unit, a division of Timex Group USA, Inc.

- Timex
- Opex
- Nautica
- TX Watch Company (2006–2011)

Sequel AG

- Guess
- Gc

Vertime SA

- Versace
- Versus

Timex Group Luxury Watches

- Philipp Plein
- Salvatore Ferragamo Timepieces
- Valentino Timeless—no longer licensed
- Vincent Bérard (2006–2010)

Giorgio Galli Design Lab (Design studio, acquired 2007) Galli designs watches for:

- Timex
- Nautica
- Salvatore Ferragamo
- Versace
- Versus

== Production ==
Timex Group B.V.'s products are manufactured in China, France, Hong Kong, India, Philippines and Switzerland, often based on technology that continues to be developed in Germany, Japan and the United States. The group has operations in a number of countries in Europe, the Americas, Asia and Oceania.
