= Waterbury Clock Company factory =

- Waterbury Clock Company
- U.S. National Register of Historic Places
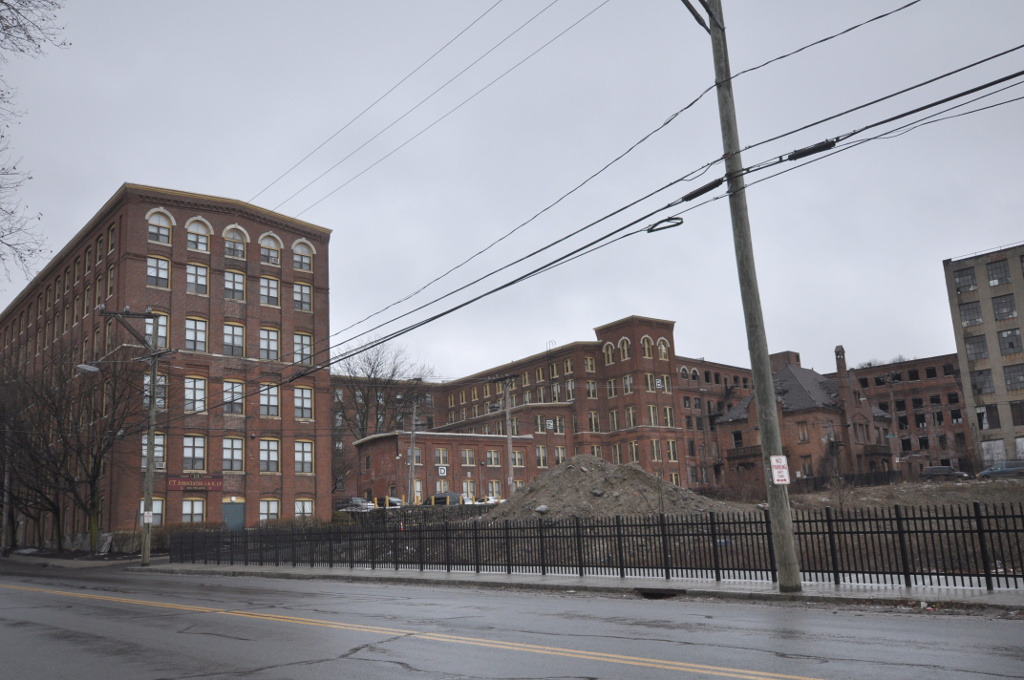

- Location within Connecticut Location within the United States
- Location: North Elm, Cherry Streets and Cherry Avenue, Waterbury, Connecticut
- Coordinates: 41°33′30″N 73°02′6″W
- Area: 6.2 acres (2.5 ha)
- Built: 1857
- NRHP reference No.: 82001005
- Added to NRHP: November 30, 1982

The Waterbury Clock Company factory is a historic complex of factory buildings in Waterbury, Connecticut. Development began in 1873, with the extensive plant serving as the company's main manufacturing facility and headquarters until 1944. The company is now known as the Timex Group USA, and was for a time one of the world's largest manufacturers of pocket watches. The surviving elements of the manufacturing complex were listed on the National Register of Historic Places in 1982. The property has since been subdivided and is home to a variety of primarily industrial or commercial uses.

== Description and history ==
The former Waterbury Clock Company plant is located north of downtown Waterbury, on 6.2 acres (2.5 ha) roughly bounded by North Elm Street, Cherry Street, and Cherry Avenue, with a portion extending south of Cherry Avenue. The property is bisected in the north–south direction by a now-subterranean stream, which once provided the power for the factory's operations. There are more than 20 buildings on the property, in varying sizes and configurations. Most are of red brick construction typical of late 19th-century mill construction.

The Waterbury Clock Company has its origins in a division of Benedict and Burnham, a leading Waterbury brass manufacturer who branched out into a variety of industries using brass in their manufacturing. The company was incorporated as a separate entity in 1857, and operated out of its parent company facilities until 1873. This site, to which it moved its operations, had previously been the site of one of Waterbury's earliest sawmills. The company met its greatest success in the 1890s, producing movements for popular dollar watches. Its fortunes declined after the First World War, and it removed from the city in 1944. It was renamed the United States Time Corporation that same year, and is now known as the Timex Group. The Waterbury plant was eventually partitioned and repurposed to other uses, including the demolition of a number of its buildings.

== See also ==
- National Register of Historic Places listings in New Haven County, Connecticut
