= Charles Henry Ingersoll =

American industrialist

Charles H. Ingersoll
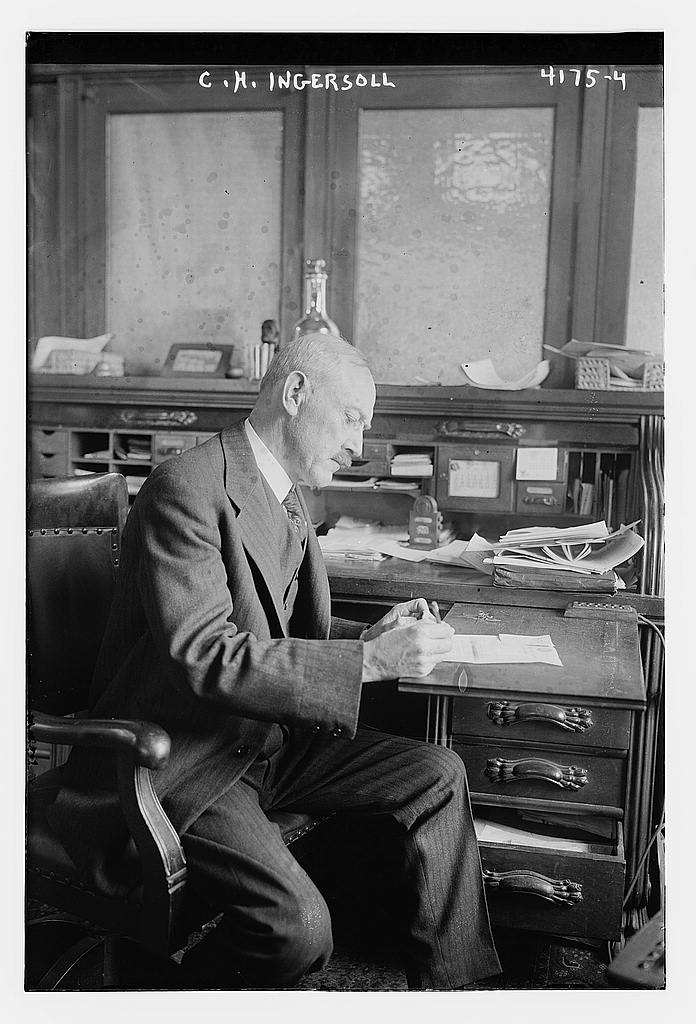
- Charles H. Ingersoll in 1917
- Born: October 29, 1865; Delta, Michigan
- Died: September 21, 1948 (aged 82); West Orange, New Jersey, U.S.
- Occupation: Businessman
- Known for: Co-founding the Ingersoll Watch Company

Charles Henry Ingersoll was an American businessman known for co-founding the Ingersoll Watch Company.

== Biography ==
Ingersoll was born on October 29, 1865, in Delta, Michigan, to Orville Boudinot Ingersoll and Mary Elizabeth Beers. His brother was Robert Hawley Ingersoll (1859-1928). He married Eleanor Ramsey Bond (1869-1928).

He co-founded the Ingersoll Watch Company in 1892. The company went bankrupt in 1921.

He switched to manufacturing fountain pens. In 1926 he converted his home in Montclair, New Jersey, into a hotel.

He died on September 21, 1948, in West Orange, New Jersey. He was buried in Mount Hebron Cemetery in Upper Montclair, New Jersey.
