= TX Watch Company =

Subsidiary of the Timex Group

- Type: Subsidiary
- Industry: Watchmaking
- Founded: 2006
- Defunct: 2011
- Area served: Worldwide
- Parent: Timex Group
- Website: www.txwatches.com (defunct)

The TX Watch Company was launched in 2006 by the Timex Group, an international holding group and corporate parent of global watchmaking companies, including Timex Group USA, Inc., TMX Philippines, Inc., and Timex Group India Ltd.

Under the TX brand, Timex marketed a line of quartz watches — debuting in Europe in late 2006 and in the US in June 2007. They were noted for a proprietary microprocessor-controlled, multi-motor, multi-hand technology that enabled a range of specialized complications atypical to non-digital, analog watches — an array of functions either not possible or highly impractical in a mechanical movement.

Marketed under the Technoluxury trademark, Timex discontinued the TX Watch Company and its brand in 2011 — migrating its multi-motor, multi-hand technology to the Timex Intelligent Quartz (IQ) sub-brand in 2012.

== Technology ==
TX Multi-motor, multi-hand, microprocessor-controlled movement with multiple complications

TX watches were engineered in Pforzheim, Germany over a five-year period, to six sigma standards. Movements were manufactured by the Timex Group in the Philippines and the watches were styled at the Timex Design Centre in Milan, Italy — formerly the Giorgio Galli Design Lab, which the Timex Group had purchased in 2007.

The TX technology used miniaturization and patented technology in a quartz movement — with digital sensors and microprocessors driving independent motors and dial hands, typically four independent motors and six hands.

The four motors operated independently with the primary motor operating four central hands (minutes, hours, seconds and a fourth function, which varied per watch model) and the other three bidirectional stepper motors enabling a range of possible complications.

The range of functions included world time for 24 global cities; regatta countdowns over five, three and one-minute durations; depth gauge; electronic compass with magnetic declination compensation; perpetual calendar; altimeter; tide; temperature and flyback chronograph (with the ability to stop the chronograph at each lap to note the lap time).

As an example, on the flyback chronograph, the movement's microprocessor could instruct the motor to regulate and position the hand for two distinct functions, with the upper sub-dial able to act as the hour gauge for the chronograph, as well as the hour indicator for the second time zone. The chronograph was capable of both 'per second' increments, and 1/5 second increments, the latter giving the illusion of the 'sweeping' movement of a mechanical movement.

Instead of conventional (metal) bearings, movements used plastic bearings, requiring neither oil nor grease lubricants for their internal operation. Where lubricants degrade and harden over time, damaging the movement, plastic bearings are designed to run "dry" — providing optimal internal operation without lubricants and without degradation or hardening. The microprocessor-controlled movements provide a maintenance-free operation, bench tested for over 87,000 hours (40 years) without interruption.

== Marketing ==
TX timepieces were marketed under the Technoluxury tagline — as wrist instruments rather than watches — offering 'innovative technology and affordable luxury' and marketed primarily to a 25–45 years old male demographic.

Marketed globally, initially in the United States, Canada, Mexico, Germany and Poland, TX offered numerous models across fifteen numbered 'series' and more than seventy models (color and band variations) — with a price range in Europe of €245 to €545 in Europe and in the United States from $375 to $626 — at the time, “the highest price yet for a Timex-developed product,” according to Herb Doscher, TX's U.S. brand manager. In the U.S., watches came with a two-year warranty.

=== Models ===
- 300 Series - Perpetual Calendar (2006, ten models)
- 310 series - Classic Perpetual Calendar (2010, _ models, Baselworld)
- 400 Series - Perpetual Weekly (2009, five models)
- 500 Series - World Time: (2006, nine models, 24 cities, winter/summer hand)
- 510 Series - World Time Continental (2009, four models, tonneau case)
- 530 Series - World Time Airport Lounge (2009, six models, globe-embossed dial)
- 550 Series - World Time Sport (2009, seven models)
- 600 Series - Pilot Flyback Chrono (2009, 2010, four+ models, titanium case, dual time zone)
- 610 Series - Classic Flyback Chronograph (2010, _ models, Baselworld)
- 650 Series - GT Fly-Back Chronograph (2010, Baselworld)
- 730 Series - Sport Flyback Chrono (2009 four models, bracelet, stopwatch, dual time zone compass)
- 770 Series - Flyback Chrono (2009, seven models, stopwatch, dual time zone compass)
- 800 Series - Linear Chronograph (2009, nine models, patented 30 minute linear hand)
- 810 Series - Classic Linear Chronograph (2010, Baselworld _models, double curve K1 hardened crystal)
- 830 Series - Linear Duo Chronograph (2009, three models, tonneau case)

TX perpetual calendar watches provide accurate day, month and date until 2100, account for short months and leap years, and require no adjustment on months with less than 31 days. They also feature retrograde dials, where a hand moves, for example, from day to day (of the week) and then back to the original position after Sunday.

TX chronographs feature a flyback function, a hand that moves (e.g., to indicate the time) along a segment of a circle, can be stopped independently and then springs backward to its starting position when it reaches the end of the scale. The flyback also has the ability to stop the chronograph at each lap to note the lap time. The chronograph continues to run and will “fly-back” to the proper current reading for the total time being measured.

=== Design features ===
Design features varied per model, including:

- Hands treated with super-luminova luminescent pigment for low-light legibility
- Flush or curved (per model) sapphire crystals with back-applied anti-reflective coating
- Stainless steel bracelets with solid end links (SELs); silicone or leather straps with deployment buckles
- Screw-down crown (e.g., (300, 500, 600 series)
- Signed, enameled or engraved crown with 'TX' logo
- Bidirectional rotating, ratcheted bezels
- E6-B 'whiz wheel' circular slide rule
- Circumferential tachymeter
- Date window, or exposed date indicator
- Sculpted, three-dimensional dials
- Dial guilloché
- Engraved casebacks
- Premium case materials (e.g., 316L stainless steel, titanium) and finishes (e.g., PVD, ion plating 0.3 – 0.5 mic Tic).

== Discontinuation ==
During the period in which The Timex Group fielded the TX Watch Company, it had expanded to include the design and manufacture of a range of watches (at the time: Vincent Berard, Versace, Versus, Valentino, Salvatore Ferragamo, Guess, Helix, Nautica, Mark Ecko, Avirex, Timex, TX, Acqua, and Carriage), and had expressed confidence in TX's potential. “TX not only demonstrates our commitment to technological and design leadership, it also shows our determination to penetrate new market segments within the industry,” said a Timex representative. “This is just the beginning.”

By 2011, Timex Group global chief operating officer Kapil Kapoor announced The Timex Group was terminating the brand — and moving its six-hand, four-motor technology to its Timex brand.

== Intelligent Quartz (IQ) ==
When the Timex Group migrated the microprocessor-controlled, multi-motor, multi-hand technology to its Timex brand in 2012, it created a sub-collection marketed as Intelligent Quartz (IQ). The line employed the same movements and capabilities from the TX brand, at a much lower price-point and without many of the distinguishing luxury features associated with the higher-end brand, e.g., the sapphire crystals and stainless steel or titanium casework.

The Intelligent Quartz line debuted at the BaselWorld international timepiece exposition in March 2011, for model year 2012.
