= Ingersoll Watch Company =

Austrian watch company

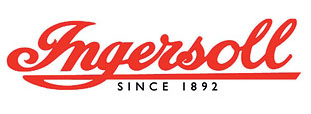
- Company type: Subsidiary
- Industry: Watch manufacturing
- Founded: 1892
- Founders: Robert Hawley and Charles Henry Ingersoll
- Headquarters: Virginia
- Parent: Zeon Ltd

The Ingersoll Watch Company is owned by Zeon Watches, a British subsidiary of the Hong Kong–based company Herald Group. The brand originated in the United States of America in 1892 .

== Origins ==
Ingersoll Watch Company grew out of a mail order business (R H Ingersoll & Bro) started in New York City in 1882 by 21-year-old Robert Hawley Ingersoll and his brother Charles Henry Ingersoll. The company initially sold low-cost items such as rubber stamps.

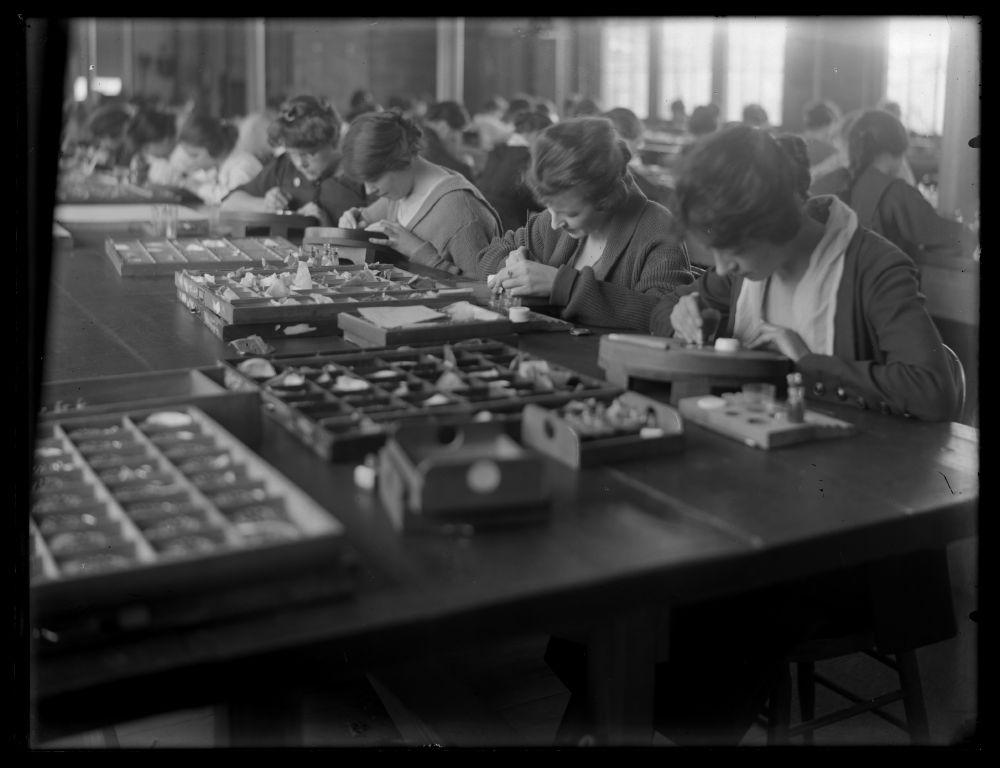
Ingersoll Watch Company workers, circa 1900

The first Ingersoll watches, called "Universal" were introduced in 1892, supplied by the Waterbury Clock Company. They were in reality small spring-driven clocks, about three inches diameter and over one inch thick. These were put into watchcases with pendants that carried bows and crowns like contemporary watches. The crown was not functional, the watch was wound by a captive key that hinged out, and a central wheel was used to set the hands, both accessible when the back was opened just as in a clock. At first they were sold wholesale to dealers, but later in 1892 a mail order catalogue was produced and watches were sold directly to the public.

The Waterbury watch company also initially sold the watches, but the Ingersolls soon negotiated a sole agency deal. In 1893 a smaller version of the Universal watch called the "Columbus" was made.

== Watches ==
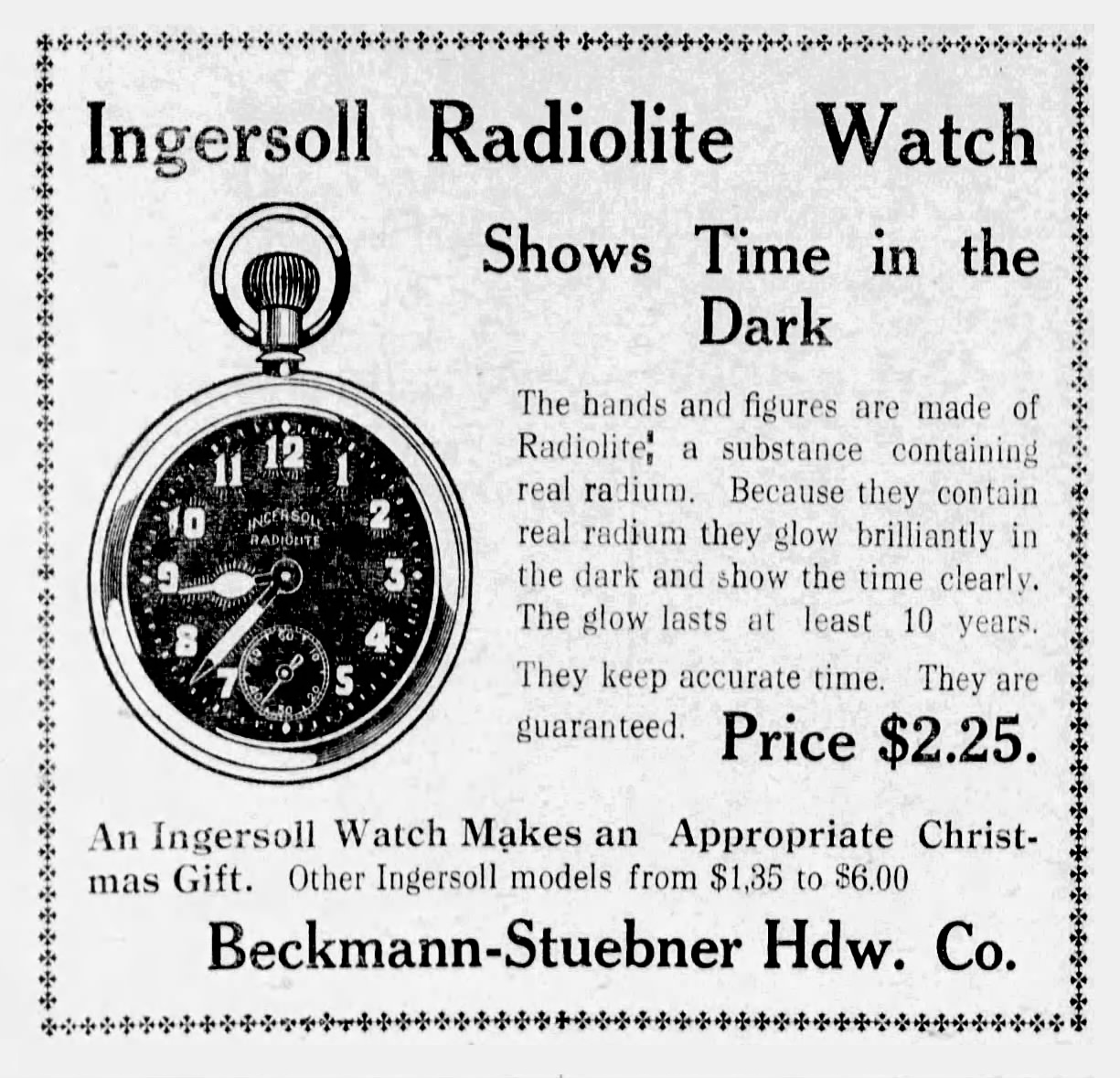
Ingersoll was a popularizer of the use of radium on hands and indices with their "Radiolite" series, seen in this 1917 ad.

In 1896 Ingersoll introduced a watch called the Yankee, setting its price at $1. This made it the cheapest watch available at the time, and the first watch to be priced at one dollar; the "dollar watch" was born. It was cheaply mass-produced from stamped parts and without jewels so it would be affordable to everyone.

By 1899 the Waterbury Clock Company were producing 8,000 of these watches per day for Ingersoll, who started advertising that 10,000 dealers carried their dollar watch. By 1910, Waterbury was producing 3,500,000 dollar watches per year for Ingersoll.

Over 20 years nearly 40 million dollar watches were sold, and Ingersoll coined the phrase "The watch that made the dollar famous!" Theodore Roosevelt mentioned that during his hunting trip in Africa he was described as "the man from the country where Ingersoll was produced".

In 1904 Ingersoll opened a store in London, England. In 1905 Robert sailed to England and introduced the Crown pocket watch for 5 shillings, which was about the same value as $1 at the time. These were made by a British subsidiary, Ingersoll Ltd, initially assembled from imported parts, and later made entirely in their London factory. These watches were made until the late 1920s, after the American parent company had collapsed.

Ingersoll bought the Trenton Watch Company in 1908, and the bankrupt New England Watch Company in Waterbury, Connecticut, for $76,000 on November 25, 1914. By 1916, the company was producing 16,000 watches per day in 10 models. That year also saw the introduction of a so-called "night design", the Radiolite featuring a luminous radium dial.

In 1917 the company produced another popular watch with seven jewels called the Reliance.

In the 1930s, the company, then named Ingersoll-Waterbury, manufactured the first Mickey Mouse watches. Over 5 million of these watches were sold in the first 15 years of production.

== Bankruptcy ==
The Ingersoll Watch Company went bankrupt in 1921 during the recession that followed World War I.

It was purchased by the Waterbury Clock Company in 1922 for $1.5 million. Waterbury Clock sold the London-based arm of the Ingersoll watch business, Ingersoll, Ltd., to its board of directors in 1930, making it a wholly British-owned enterprise. In 1944, the Waterbury Clock Company was renamed United States Time Corporation (now Timex Group USA) and continued producing Ingersoll watches in the United States through the 1950s.

== Anglo-Celtic Company Ltd ==
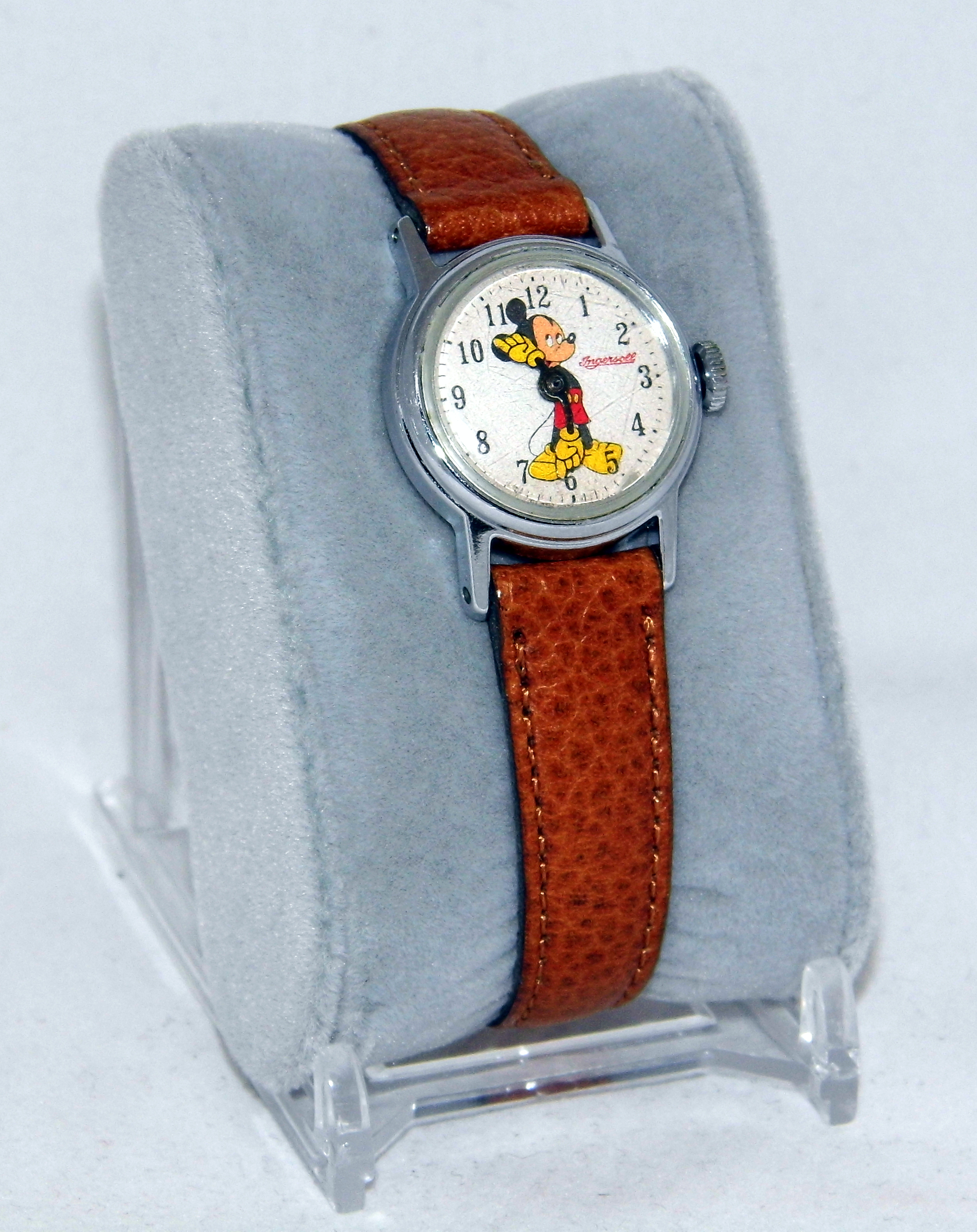
Mickey Mouse windup watch manufactured by Ingersoll

After the Second World War, the British company, Ingersoll Ltd, joined with Smiths Industries Ltd and Vickers Armstrong in setting up the Anglo-Celtic Company Ltd on the Ynyscedwyn estate. This was on the outskirts of the village of Ystradgynlais, near Swansea, Wales. The first model featured the same movement as the earlier British Ingersolls, now designated calibre PY. These watches were branded Ingersoll Triumph and Smiths Empire. Ingersoll Ltd pulled out of the venture in 1969. Between 1946 and 1980, when the factory closed down, over 30,000,000 watches were made, and exported to 60 countries throughout the world.

They also made many character pocket watches, of many subjects from the 1930s – Betty Boop, Big Bad Wolf, Buck Rogers, Dizzy Dean, Donald Duck, Flash gordon, Lone Ranger, Mickey Mouse, Moon Mullins, Popeye, Rudy Nebb, Skeezix, Smitty, Three Little Pigs, and Tom Mix.

In the years after World War II, watch face themes included Captain Marvel, Captain Midnight, Dan Dare, Dick Tracy, Donald Duck, Hopalong Cassidy, Jeff Arnold, and Peter Pan.

== Current ownership ==
In 1989 Richard Tibber owner of Zeon ltd purchased the Ingersoll Company and Brand from Steven Strauss Ltd-Ingersoll. Brand is currently still owned by Zeon Watches, a British subsidiary of the Hong Kong company Herald Group. Ingersoll watches are distributed in more than 50 countries.

== See also ==
- Timexpo Museum
