= Giorgio Galli (watchmaker) =

Italian watchmaker

Giorgio Galli is an Italian watch designer, and global creative director for Timex Group. His design studio is in Milan, Italy. Galli has worked for Swatch, Citizen, Ebel and Seiko, and has been described by Hodinkee as "an OG of the watch industry". Under his leadership, Timex partnered with cult sportswear brand Supreme, British menswear designer Nigel Cabourn, and streetwear company Hypebeast.
