= American clock =

Style of clock design

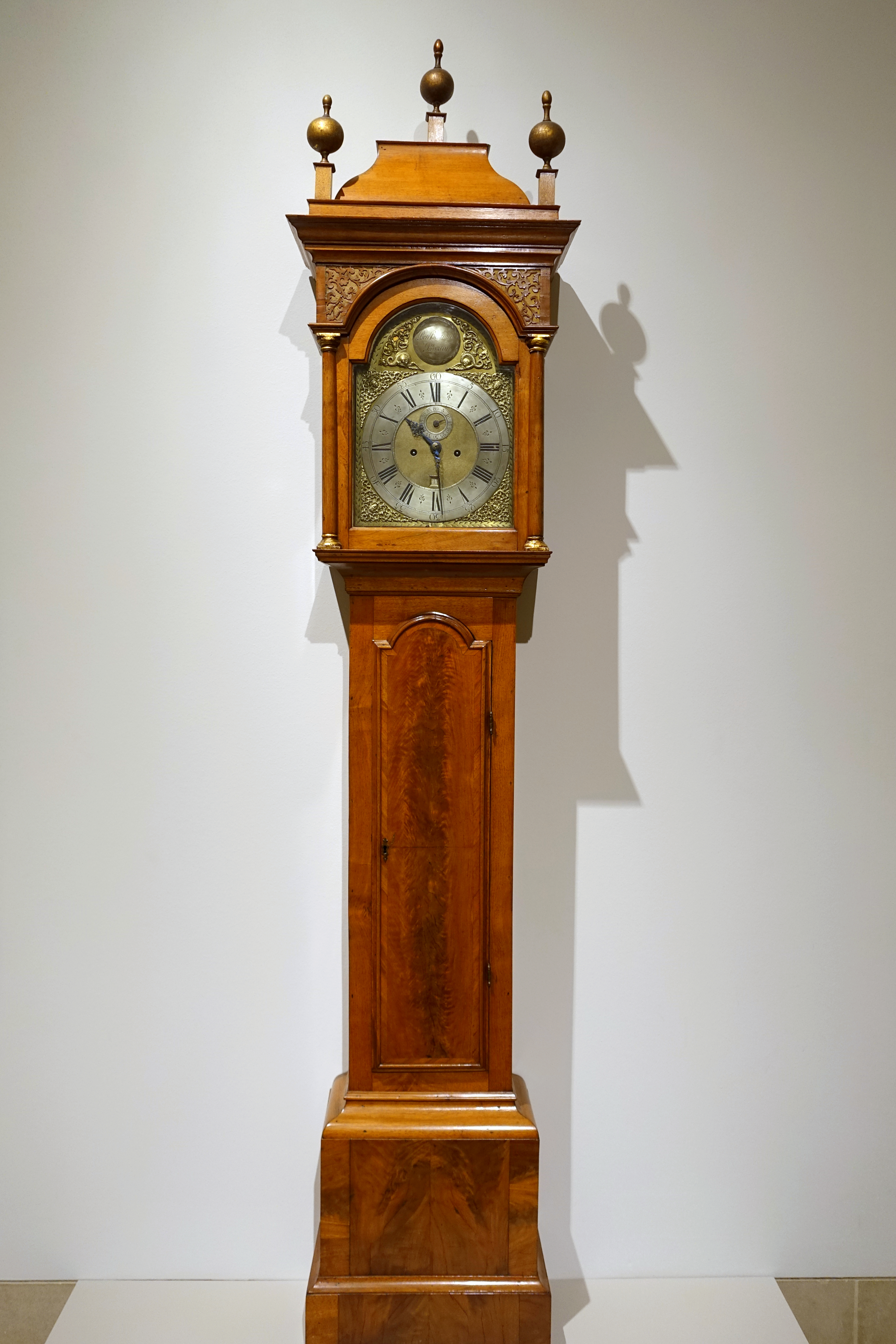
^{Dallas Museum of Art} The Metropolitan Museum of Art in New York City holds in its collections a tall-case striking clock that Benjamin Bagnall, Sr., constructed in Boston before 1740 and that Elisha Williams probably acquired between 1725 and 1739 while he was rector of Yale College.

The term American clock refers to a style of clock design. During the 1600s, when metal was harder to come by in the colonies than wood, works for many American clocks were made of wood, including the gears, which were whittled and fashioned by hand, as were all other parts. There is some evidence that wooden clocks were being made as early as 1715 near New Haven. Benjamin Cheney of East Hartford, Connecticut, was producing wooden striking clocks by 1745.

In the 19th century, many clocks and watches were produced in the United States, especially in Connecticut, where many companies were formed to mass-produce quality timepieces. Makers of American clocks included:

- Ansonia Clock Company, 1851–1930
- Waterbury Clock Company, 1857–1944
- Seth Thomas Clock Company, 1853–1930
- W.L. Gilbert & Co., 1845–48 and 1851–66, later Gilbert Mfg. Co., William L. Gilbert Clock Company
- Elias Ingraham & Co., 1857–60, 1861–1958
- E.N. Welch Mfg. Co., 1864–1903
- Sessions Clock Co., 1903–56
- New Haven Clock Co., 1853–1960
- F. Kroeber Clock Co., 1863–1904
- Boston Clock Company, 1884–1894, founded by Joseph Eastman

== Sources ==
- Gottshall, Franklin H. (1971). Making Antique Furniture Reproductions: Instructions and Measured Drawings for 40 Classic Projects. New York: Dover Publications. ISBN 978-0-486-16164-8. "Before the eighteenth century, when metal was harder to come by in the colonies than wood, which was in plentiful supply, works for many of these clocks were made of wood, including the gears, which were whittled and fashioned by hand, as indeed were all other parts."
- Safford, Frances Gruber; Heckscher, Morrison H.; Rogers, Mary-Alice (1985). American Furniture in the Metropolitan Museum of Art: 1, Late Colonial Period: The Queen Anne and Chippendale Styles. New York: The Metropolitan Museum of Art; Random House. ISBN 978-0-300-11647-2.
