= Timex Group USA =

American global watch manufacturing company

Timex Group USA, Inc.
- Brand logo since 2017

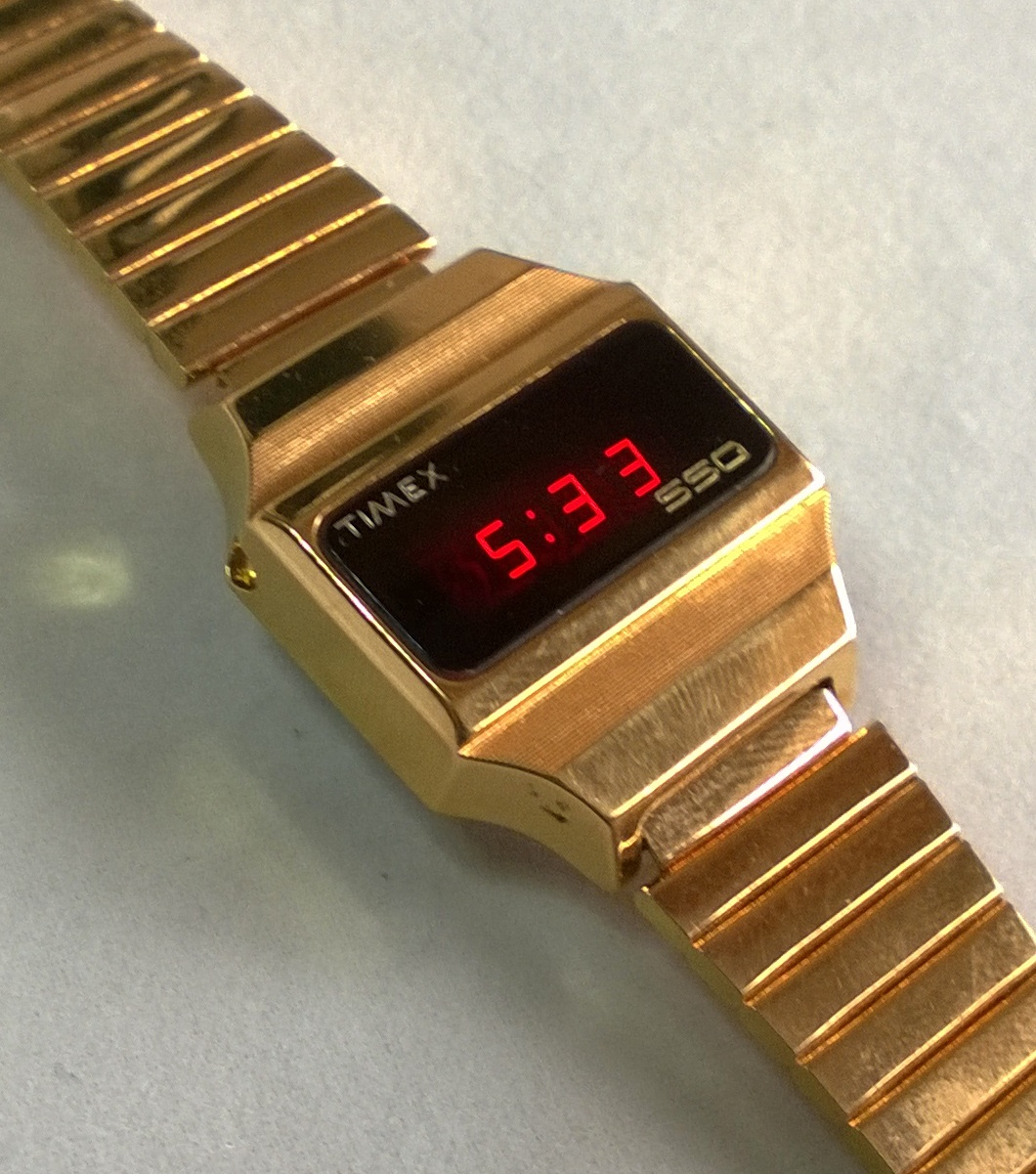
- A 1976 Timex SSQ (Solid State Quartz) LED Watch, Timex's competitor to the Hamilton Watch Company's Pulsar
- Formerly: Waterbury Clock Company, Timex Corporation
- Type: Subsidiary
- Industry: Watch
- Founded: 1854; 172 years ago
- Headquarters: Shelton, Connecticut, with various operations in Europe, the Americas, and Asia
- Area served: Worldwide
- Key people: Tobias Reiss-Schmidt (President & CEO); Colin Arsenault (CFO)
- Products: Watches
- Number of employees: 7,000
- Parent: Timex Group
- Website: www.timex.com

Timex, officially Timex Group USA, Inc. (formerly known as Timex Corporation) is an American global watch brand and manufacturing company founded in 1854 as the Waterbury Clock Company in Waterbury, Connecticut. In 2008, the company was acquired by Timex Group B.V. and was renamed Timex Group USA. However, Timex Group USA is the original company that the holding company is named after.

Originally specializing in affordable clocks, the company gained a reputation for applying mass-production techniques to timekeeping devices, making reliable products accessible to a wider public at a time when clocks and watches were often considered luxury items. In doing so, they become one of the most well known brands in America during the late 20th century. The brand primarily competed with Casio and Seiko in the early digital watch market, pioneering in both LED and LCD watches with their SSQ (Solid State Quartz) digital watch line and with their Indiglo backlight system.

== History ==
=== Waterbury Clock Company (1854–1944) ===
Brass manufacturer Benedict & Burnham created Waterbury Clock Company in 1854 to manufacture clocks using brass wheels and gears. Waterbury Clock Company was legally incorporated on March 27, 1857, as an independent business with $60,000 in capital. The American clock industry was producing millions of clocks with scores of companies located in Connecticut's Naugatuck River Valley, earning the region the nickname "Switzerland of America". The Waterbury Clock Company was one of the largest producers for both domestic sales and export, primarily to Europe.

==== Ingersoll Watch Company ====
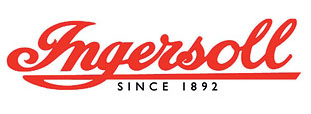
Ingersoll Watch Company

The company originally produced clocks as less expensive alternatives to the high-end European counterparts of the time. In 1887, they introduced the large Jumbo pocket watch, invented by Archibald Bannatyne and named after the famous P. T. Barnum elephant. The Jumbo was put on the market in New York City on a trial basis, catching the attention of Robert H. Ingersoll, a salesman and eventual marketing pioneer. During the turn of the century, Waterbury Clock Company produced millions of pocket watches for the Robert H. Ingersoll & Bro. watch company, in which Robert partnered with his brother Charles. In 1896, Ingersoll introduced the Ingersoll Yankee, a dollar pocket watch supplied by Waterbury Clock Company. These watches gained such great popularity that they became known as "the watch that made the dollar famous."

==== Waterbury Watch Company ====
In 1877, a new prototype was introduced to Benedict and Burnham for an inexpensive pocket watch made of 58 parts, mostly punched sheet brass. They immediately set aside an unused portion of their machine shop and began producing the Long Wind at a rate of 200 per day by 1878. The department quickly outgrew its space in the plant, so Benedict & Burnham incorporated Waterbury Clock's sister company Waterbury Watch Company in 1880 with a capital of $400,000 to manufacture and sell inexpensive watches and other timepieces. Waterbury Watch started out very successfully in its early days, employing hundreds of women for their "slender fingers" and "delicate manipulation", and it became the largest-volume producer of watches in the world by 1888.

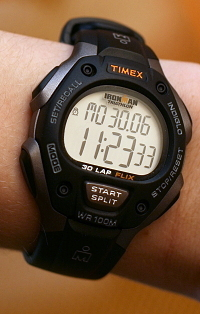
A Timex Ironman watch

Waterbury Watch quickly fell into bankruptcy, however, due to poor sales techniques where "jobbers" and salesmen gave away much of the product as loss leaders with little regard to the company's future, thereby cheapening the products' perceived value. In a last attempt to salvage the company, Waterbury Watch began to produce higher-end watch models which only created more demand on a workforce unable to keep up with the complexity of the new watches using several hundred parts. The company was finally reorganized as the New England Watch Company in 1898, as its London sales office was placed into liquidation. The company continued to focus on high-priced watch models and eventually fell into receivership, discontinuing business in July 1912. Robert H. Ingersoll & Bro. bought the Waterbury plant and began manufacturing Ingersoll Watches there in 1914.

==== Advent of the wristwatch ====
World War I brought new demands for timepiece design; artillery gunners, for example, needed an easy way to calculate and read time while still being able to work the guns. The Waterbury Clock Company met this need by modifying their small Ingersoll ladies' Midget pocket watch. They added lugs for a canvas strap, repositioned the crown to 3 o'clock, and made the hands and numbers luminescent for nighttime readability, thus producing one of the first wristwatches.

In 1922, Waterbury Clock Company purchased the Robert H. Ingersoll & Bro. company for $1.5 million. The firm had gone bankrupt the previous year due to the post-war recession. However, Waterbury Clock was unable to deliver on Ingersoll's guarantee of quality in Europe due to the Great Depression, so they sold the London-based Ingersoll, Ltd. to its board of directors in 1930, making it a wholly British-owned enterprise. The Ingersoll brand name was continued in the United States by Waterbury Clock into the 1950s, while Ingersoll Ltd. produced the Ingersoll watch brand independently for the European and other markets.

Waterbury Clock Company regained its identity in the consumer market after the Great Depression and a period of hardship. They reached a license agreement with Walt Disney in 1930 to produce the famous Mickey Mouse watches and clocks under the Ingersoll brand name. They introduced the Mickey Mouse timepieces to the public at the Chicago World's Fair in June 1933, and they quickly became the company's first million-dollar line, saving it from financial disaster.

Thomas Olsen was the owner of Fred. Olsen Shipping Co., and he fled Norway in 1940 together with Joakim Lehmkuhl and their families because of the Nazi invasion. They eventually came to the United States seeking investments to assist in the war effort. Olsen and Lehmkuhl purchased controlling interest in Waterbury Clock Company in 1941, and Olsen became chairman. Olson appointed Lehmkuhl president, who had studied business and engineering at Harvard and MIT, and the company became the largest producer of fuse timers for precision defense products in the United States under his direction. They built a new concrete plant in nearby Middlebury, Connecticut in 88 days in 1942 for the high-volume production of precision timers. In August 1943, the Under-Secretary of War awarded the Waterbury Clock Company the Army-Navy "E" Award for excellence for their "Anglo-American fuse", and shareholders voted the following December to rename the company United States Time Corporation.

=== United States Time Corporation (1944–1969) ===
Sales declined after the Korean War in the 1950s because of diminishing defense orders, and United States Time president Lehmkuhl was convinced that an inexpensive watch would be a market success if it was both accurate and durable. He felt that low cost could be accomplished through the combination of automation, the precision tooling techniques used in making fuse timers, and a simpler design than that of higher-priced Swiss watches. Durability was accomplished through a new hard alloy called Armalloy, developed through wartime research. Armalloy was used to produce longwearing bearings, replacing the expensive jewels traditionally used in a watch's movement. These innovations led to the debut of the Timex brand in 1950, though the name was first used on a small trial shipment of nurses' watches in 1945.

US Time Corporation bought Lacher & Co. AG in Pforzheim, Germany (the Laco brand), on February 1, 1959, in order to acquire the electric watch technology which that company had developed. They also purchased the DUROWE (Deutsche Uhrenrohwerke) brand. Timex sold Durowe to the Swiss movement manufacturer ETA SA on September 1, 1965.

==== Slogan: World's largest manufacturer of watches and mechanical time fuses ====
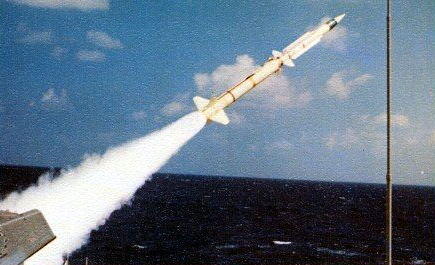
Navy Terrier missile is controlled in flight through the stabilization system, provided by the U.S. Time–manufactured gyro

The company manufactured mechanical components for missiles during the boom of American missile development in the late 1950s, including fuses, gyroscope, accelerometers, guidance sub-system, and various other miniature precision items. The company promoted its products under the claim of being the "world's largest manufacturer of watches and mechanical time fuses."

The company also produced ammunition components, and repaired, installed, and reactivated government-owned production equipment. The height of the company's ordnance and ammunition business lasted through the Vietnam era in the 1960s and 1970s, during which it operated Joliet Army Ammunition Plant as well as privately owned plants and storage facilities.

==== Slogan: It takes a licking and keeps on ticking ====
John Cameron Swayze was widely viewed as the most credible newsman in the United States, so Lehmkuhl decided to hire him as a company spokesman for live "torture tests" on television using Russ Alben's slogan "Timex – Takes a Licking and keeps on Ticking". Hirshon Garfield developed these commercials as elaborations on tests suggested by United States Time Corporation salesmen. The commercials included high-divers, water skiers, a dolphin, dishwashers, jackhammers, paint mixers, and the propeller of an outboard motor, each torturing a Timex watch.

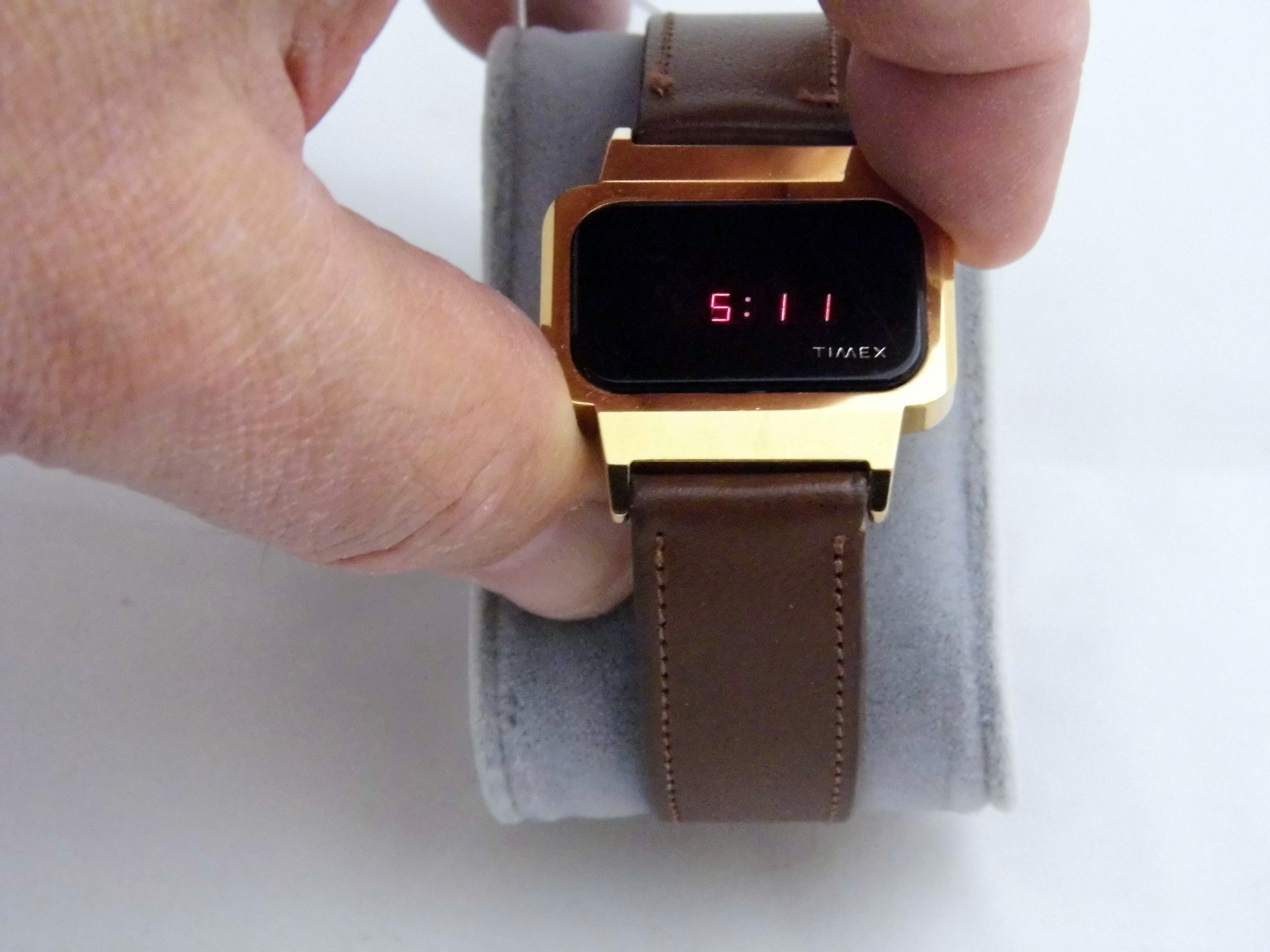
An early 1970s Timex LED watch

Consumer demand increased for the watches, despite resistance from jewelers because of the low 50% markup, and Timex opened new distribution channels including department stores, cigar stands, drug stores, and other mass-market outlets. By 1962, the Timex brand held the number one market share position in the United States, where one out of every three watches sold was a Timex. Foreign markets were added with company sales offices in Canada, Mexico, France, Great Britain, Germany, and Portugal, as well as distributors in about 20 other countries. Plants were built in the United States, Europe, and Asia.

Edwin H. Land, co-founder of Polaroid Corporation, contacted United States Time Corporation in 1948 in search of a manufacturer for his cameras. A strong relationship was forged between the companies in 1950 resulting in United States Time becoming the exclusive manufacturer of all Polaroid cameras worldwide through the 1970s, totaling more than 44 million cameras. United States Time Corporation was renamed Timex Corporation on July 1, 1969.

=== Timex Corporation (1969–2008) ===
Timex logo used during the 1980s

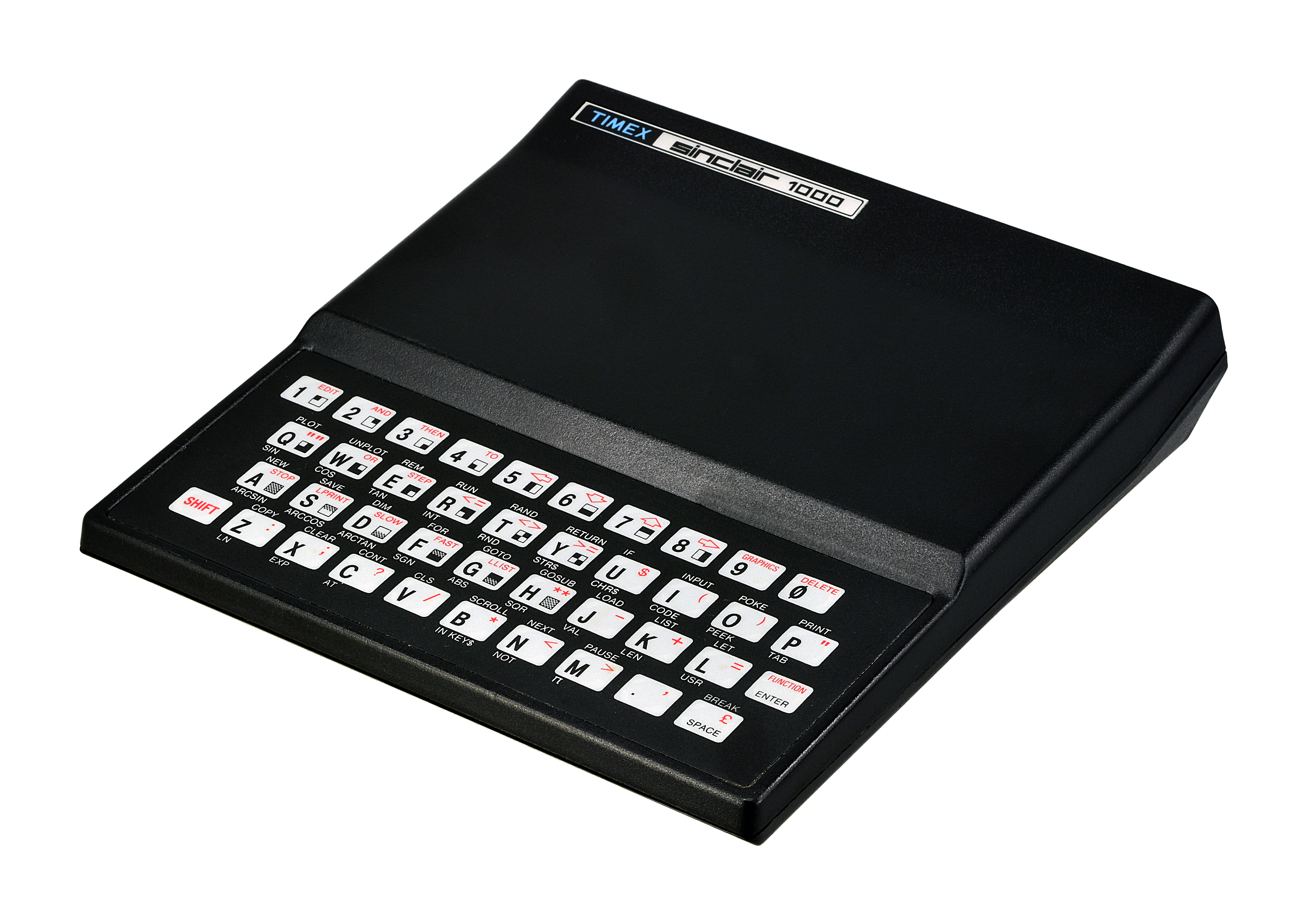
Timex Sinclair 1000

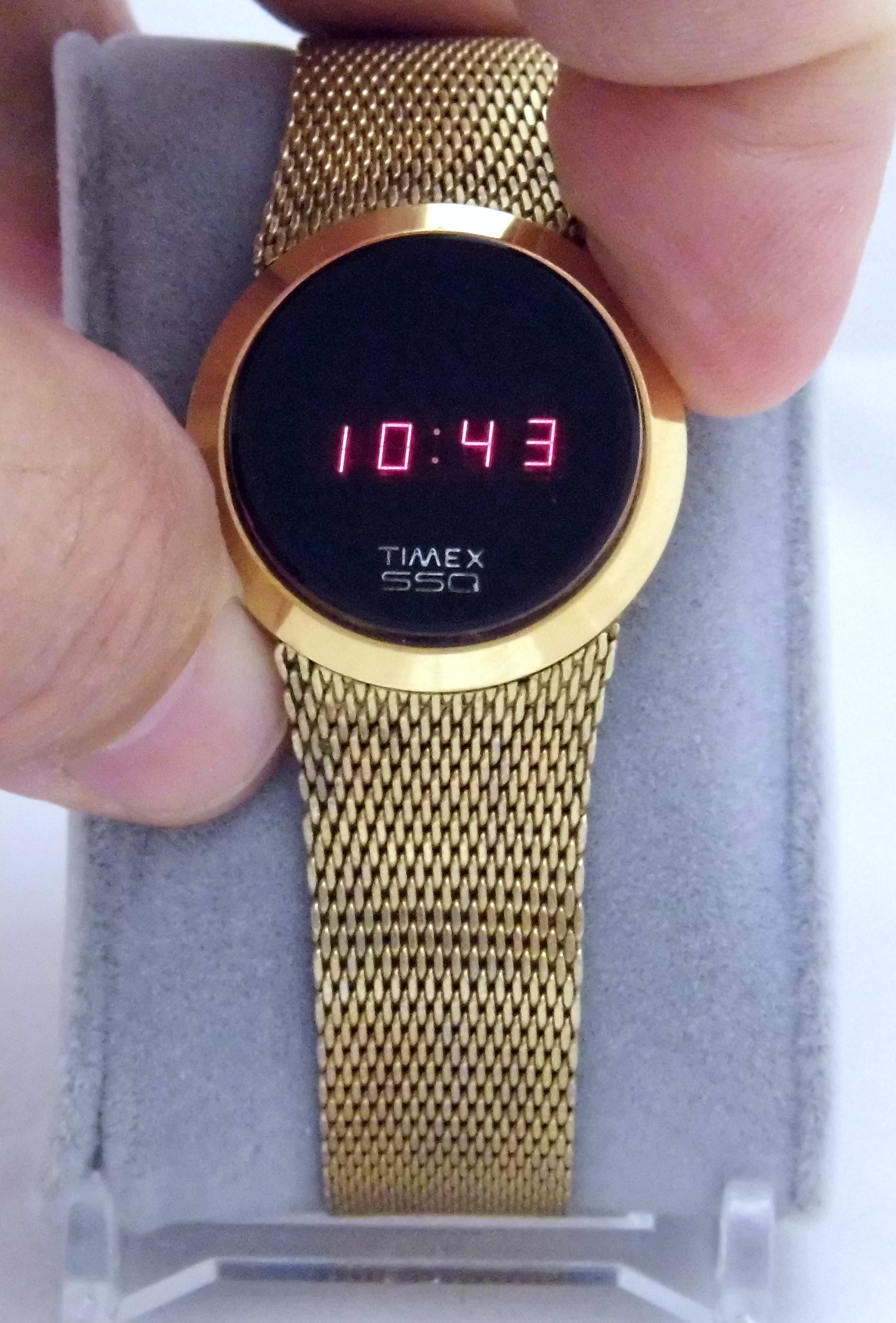
A Mid-1970s Timex SSQ LED Digital Watch

In the 1970s and early 1980s, the American watch and clock industry was devastated by the arrival of cheap mechanical watches from the Far East, as well as the development of digital quartz watches pioneered by Japanese companies. Lehmkuhl retired in 1973 with no clear successor, and Polaroid ended its contract with Timex in 1975, resulting in a layoff of 2,000 employees. New technology was developing rapidly in the form of electronic digital watches and quartz analog watches, making Timex's mechanical watchmaking production facilities obsolete. Timex closed and consolidated worldwide operations, cutting the 30,000 employee workforce to 6,000. New competitors were aggressively entering the business, including Japanese companies, low-cost Hong Kong producers, and large American companies such as Gillette, Texas Instruments, and National Semi-Conductor. The Disney license had expired and John Cameron Swayze retired from his role as spokesman. The sub-contracting business was rebuilt with new customers such as IBM, Hugin-Sweda, and General Electric. The company entered the home computer business in a joint venture with Sinclair Research Ltd. named Timex Sinclair, selling computers as the Timex Sinclair 1000 and succeeding machines, modeled on the ZX81 and ZX Spectrum. They faced declining sales amid a price war with Commodore Business Machines in 1984 and decided not to compete in that market any longer.

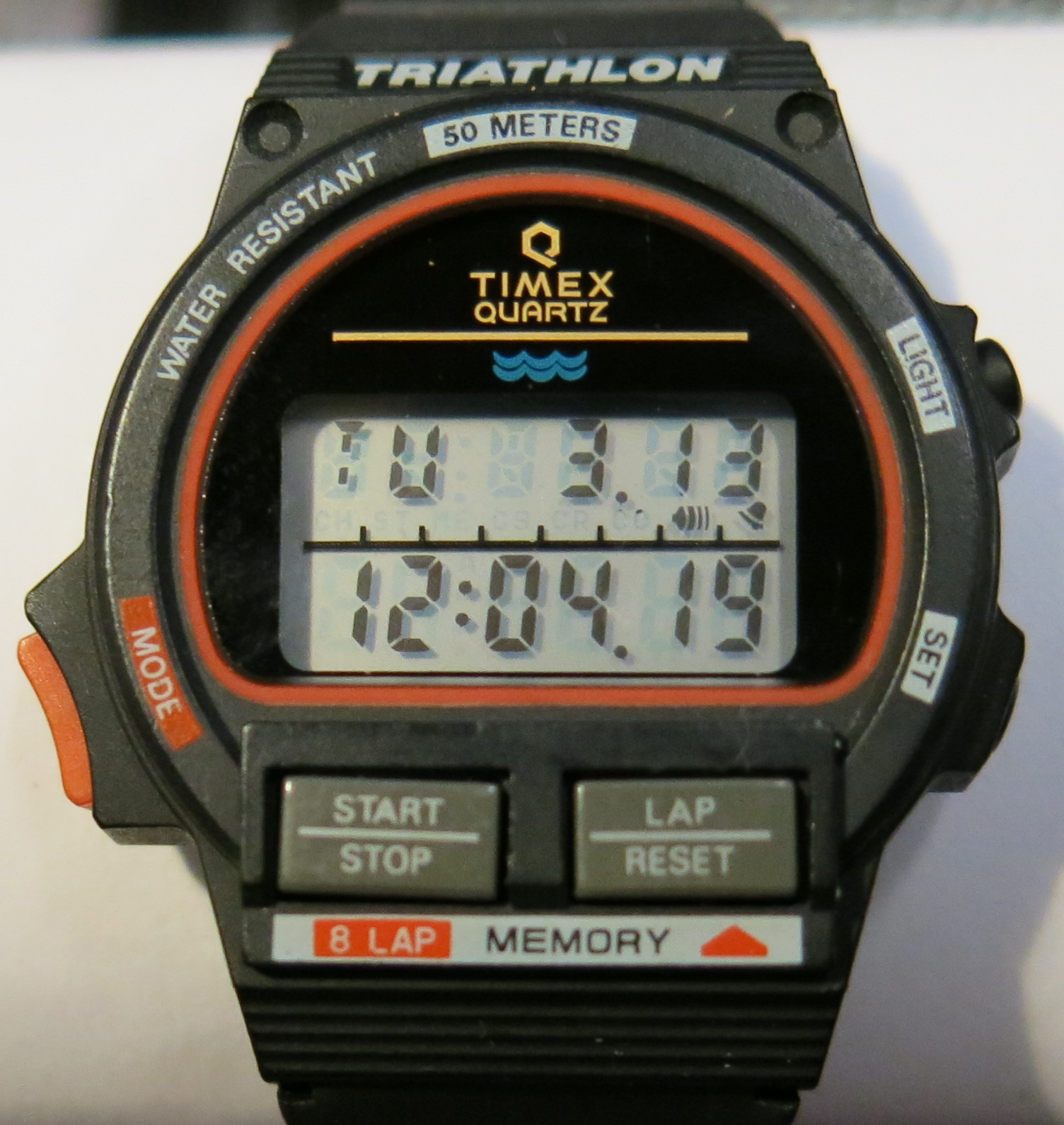
Original Timex Triathlon Watch from 1984, precursor to the Ironman series of watches

In 1979, Timex purchased the former Telechron plants from General Electric, which acquired the Telechron company in 1943 when the latter's founder, Henry E. Warren, retired. Timex continued to produce the GE-branded synchronous electric clocks until the early to mid-1980s. In the mid-1980s, Timex abandoned its development of various consumer products and refocused efforts specifically on timepieces. Product quality and fashionable design became essential to success in the mass market. Timex had a solid reputation for durable products, and the company put increased efforts behind quality improvement. Longer battery life, more durable gold plating, greater accuracy, and more water-resistant styles were some of the many improvements that they implemented. They created new quartz analog movements using fewer components, reducing overall production time and costs. Top athletes assisted in the design of sports watches for specific sports, which led to the introduction of the Ironman Triathlon in 1986 which was named for the Hawaiian triathlon that the company had sponsored since 1984, and it became the most successful Timex watch in the post-mechanical watch era. Within its first year, Timex Ironman became the best-selling watch in the United States, and the world's largest selling sport watch for the next decade.

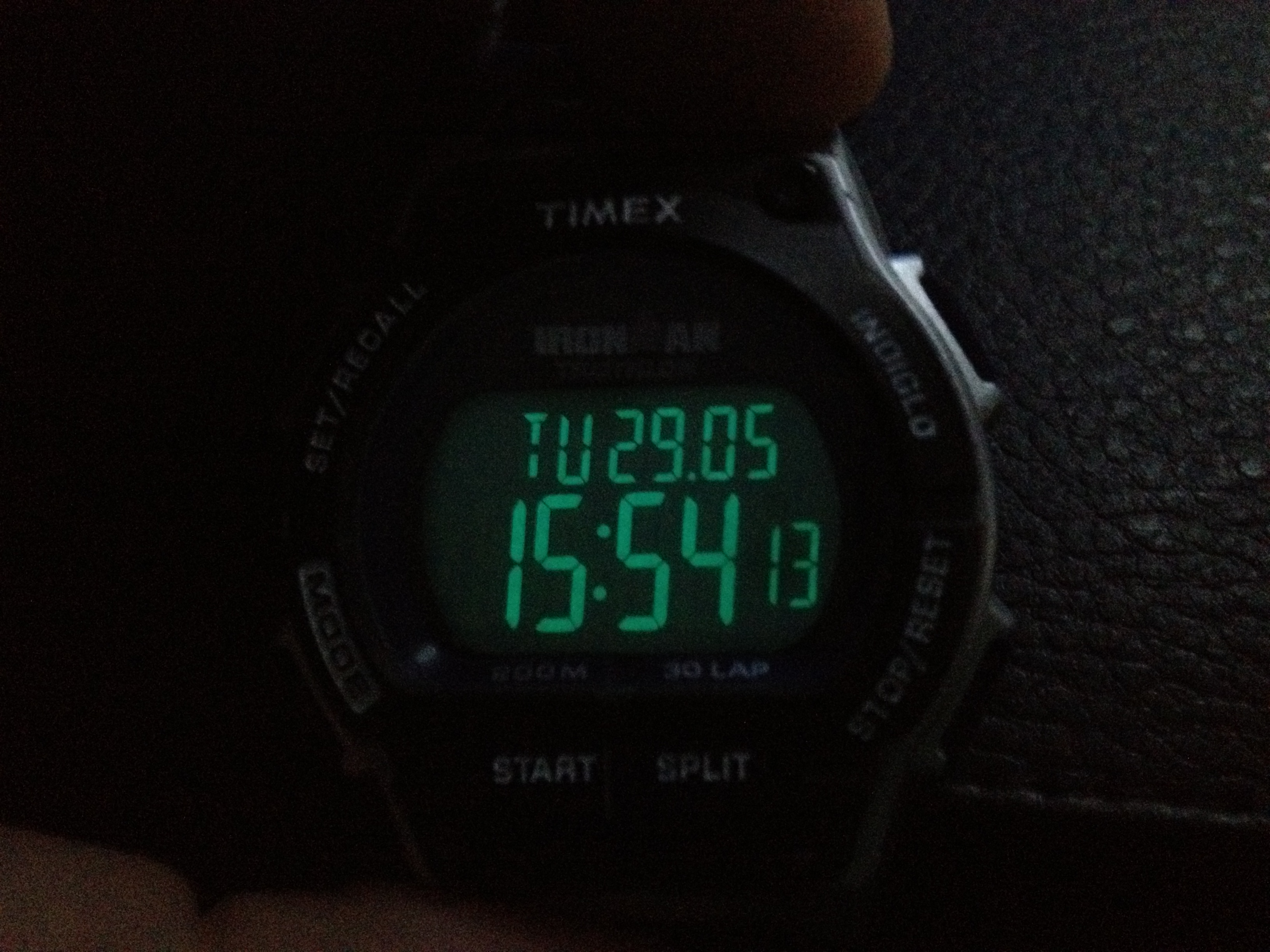
An example of an Indiglo backlight

Timex introduced the Indiglo night light during the Christmas shopping season in 1992. Indiglo made headlines as a result of the February 26, 1993 World Trade Center bombing, in which an office worker wearing a Timex with an Indiglo night light used its light to guide a group of evacuees down 40 dark flights of stairs. This caused sales to immediately take off and led to an increase in Timex's American market share.

Timex Corporation acquired Callanen International in 1991, the producer of Guess Watches, as part of its "multi-brand strategy". Timex and Disney reunited in 1993 to produce a new line of character watches called the Disney Classics Collection. Also in 1993, the Timex Factory at Dundee in the UK, was the site of a major industrial strike. In 1994, Timex acquired the Nautica Watches license and introduced Timex Data Link. The Data Link PDA-type watch could receive contact and scheduling information from a sequence in a computer monitor's light using software developed with Microsoft. They introduced the Timex Expedition brand in 1997, designed for rugged outdoor sports. Timex and Motorola introduced Beepwear in 1998, a watch with an integrated pager.

The new millennium led to further growth of Timex Corporation and its parent Timex Group B.V., by way of brand acquisition, brand introduction, and licensing partnerships. In 2000, Timex Corporation purchased the French fashion watch brand Opex. Under its Callanen subsidiary, Timex acquired the watch license for urban fashion designer Marc Eckō in 2002. The company entered the luxury market in 2005 when Timex's parent company acquired Swiss-based Vertime SA. Vertime is responsible for the design, manufacturing, and distribution of Swiss-made watches and jewelry for the Versace and Versus brands. Timex USA's international holding company the Timex Group launched the TX Watch Company in late 2006. In 2007, Timex Group B.V. established Sequel AG as a separate company devoted to the design, manufacture, and distribution of the Guess and the Swiss-made Gc watch brands. Timex Group B.V. purchased the Italian design studio Giorgio Galli Design Lab in 2007.

=== Timex Group USA, Inc. (2008–present) ===
Timex logo

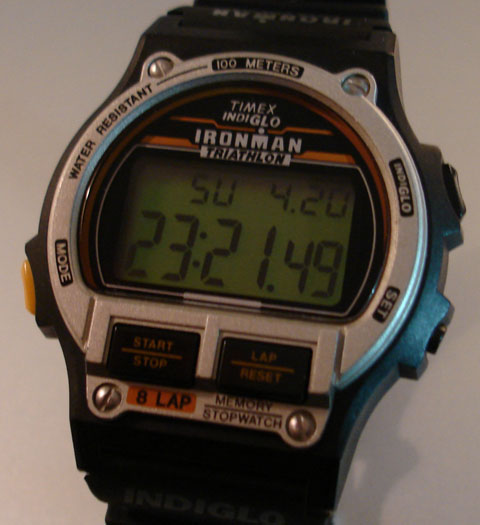
Timex Ironman 20th Anniversary Watch, released in 2008

The company was restructured in early 2008, establishing the Timex Business Unit as a separate business function for the Timex brand with its own president. Previous Timex Group CEOs had managed the Timex Group and brand, which had contributed to the brand's lower earnings in the previous five years. Timex Group's Sequel division houses the Guess collections and had grown tremendously to rival Timex as the firm's top earner, but the signature brand had been flat as of August 2008. Since this change, Timex has introduced GPS enabled watches, heart rate monitor exercise watches, and similar devices.

In 2008, Timex Group USA signed a four-year agreement making Timex the first official timekeeper of the New York City Marathon. Meanwhile, parent company Timex Group B.V. launched Swiss-made luxury watch brands Salvatore Ferragamo Timepieces and Valentino Timeless under the Timex Group Luxury Watches business. That same year, they began construction on the second-largest ground-mounted solar array in the United States at Timex Group USA's headquarters in Middlebury, Connecticut. They inaugurated the 800-panel solar array on February 5, 2009, during a press event held at the headquarters. A few months later, Timex Group USA purchased the Marc Eckō watch trademark which it had licensed since 2002. The Callanen International business unit merged with the Timex Business Unit in 2009, bringing the Timex, Opex, TX, Nautica, and Marc Eckō brands under one company.

== Timex Group B.V. ==
Timex Group B.V., a Dutch holding company, is the corporate parent of several watchmaking companies around the globe including Timex Group USA, Inc. Businesses and exclusive worldwide licenses include the Timex Business Unit (Timex, Timex Ironman, Opex, Nautica, Marc Eckō), Sequel (Guess, Gc), Timex Group Luxury Division (Versace, Versus, Salvatore Ferragamo, Vincent Bérard, CT Scuderia and Teslar) and Giorgio Galli Design Lab.

Today, Timex Group B.V.'s products are manufactured in the Far East, and in Switzerland, often based on technology that continues to be developed in the United States and in Germany. The group has operations in a number of countries in Europe, the Americas, and Asia. Many Timex Far East operation wristwatches are manufactured by TMX Philippines Inc. in Lapu-Lapu, Philippines. Timex Group B.V.'s export from the factory in the Philippines is made through their own company. Tmx Limited N.V., based in Curaçao.

== See also ==
- American clock
- Indiglo
- Ingersoll Watch Company
- Timex Datalink
- Timex Ironman
- Timexpo Museum
