= Electric organ =

Electronic keyboard instrument

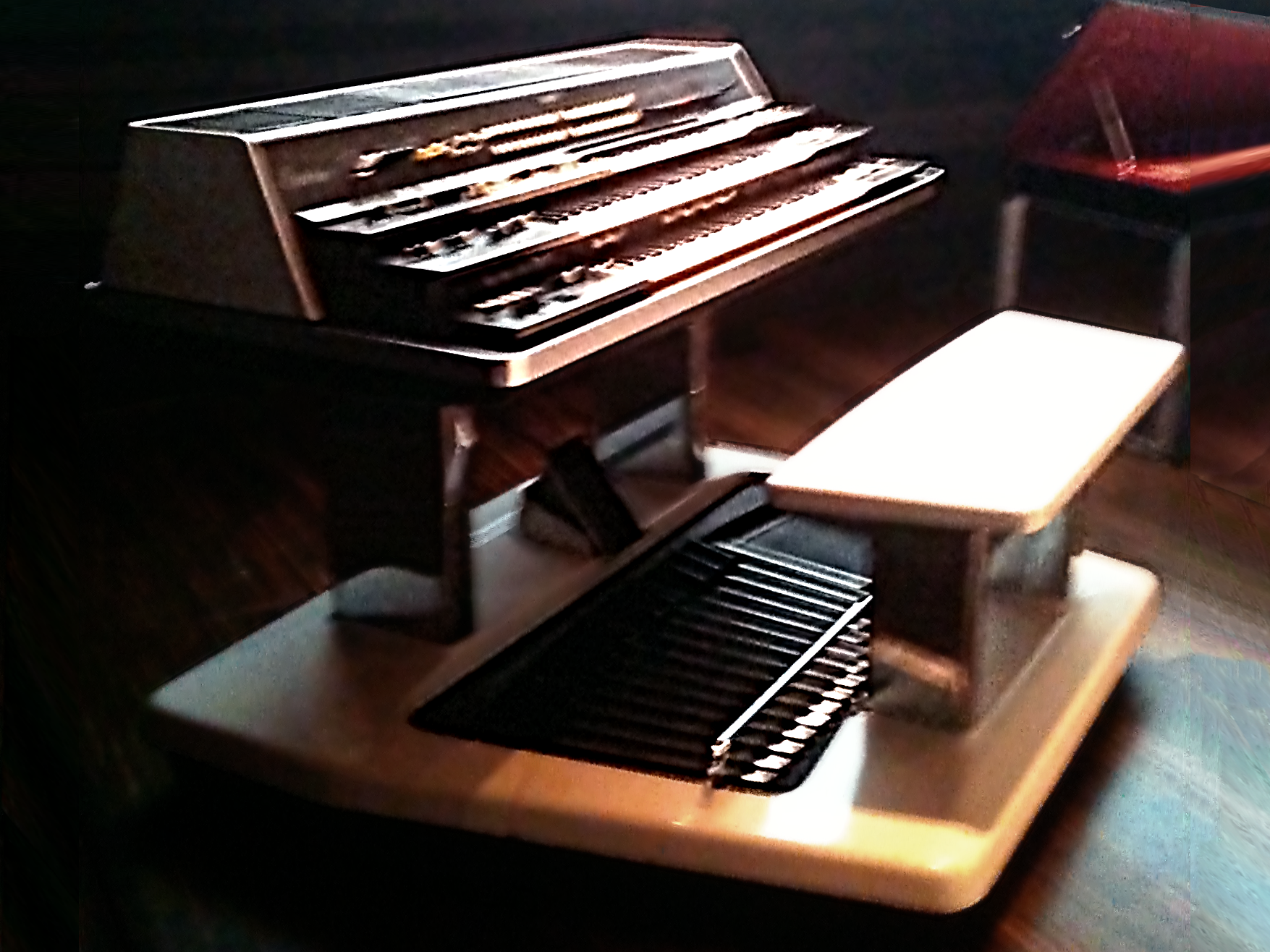
Yamaha GX-1, an early polyphonic synthesizer organ in the 1970s

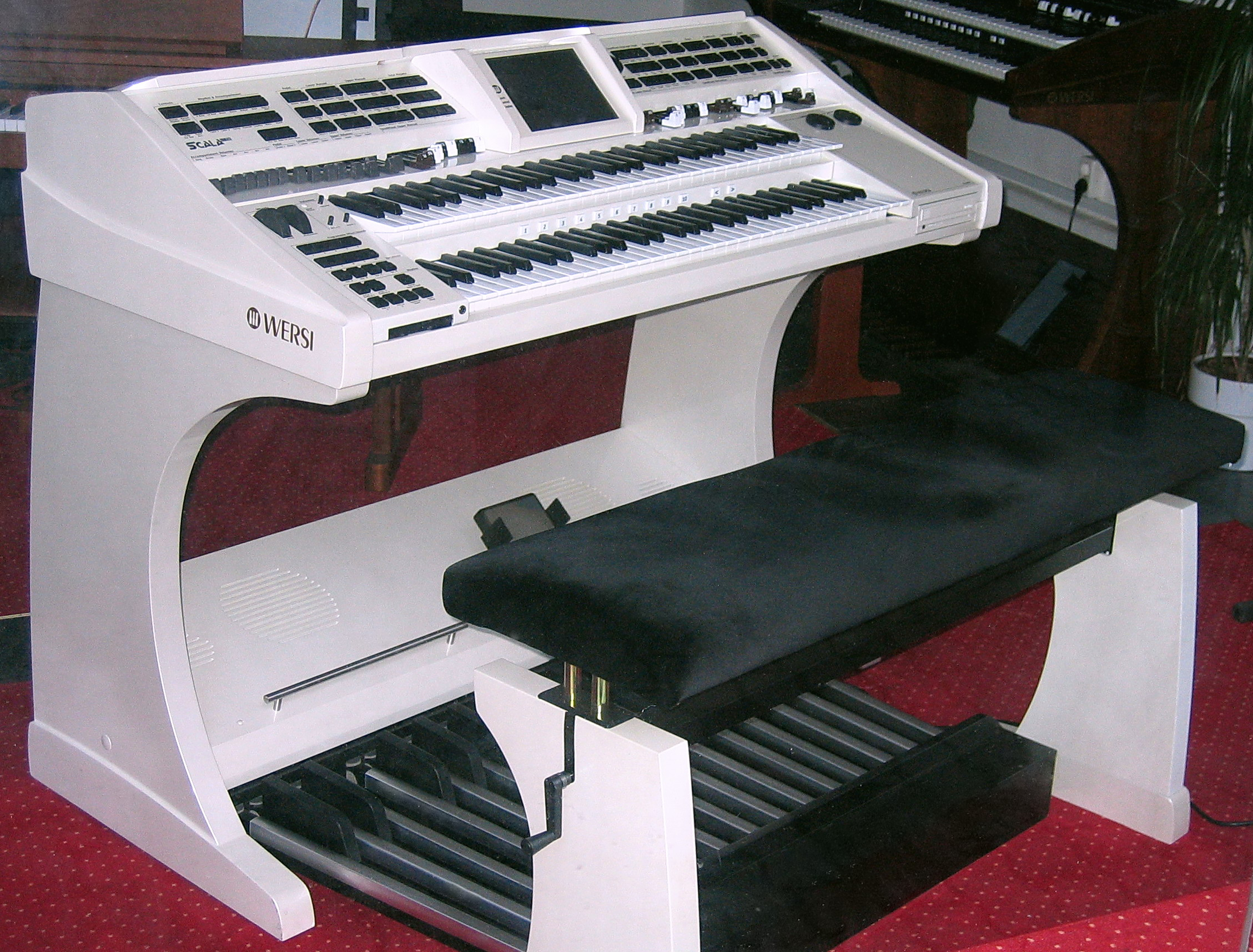
WERSI Scala, an open architecture software organ platform in 2002

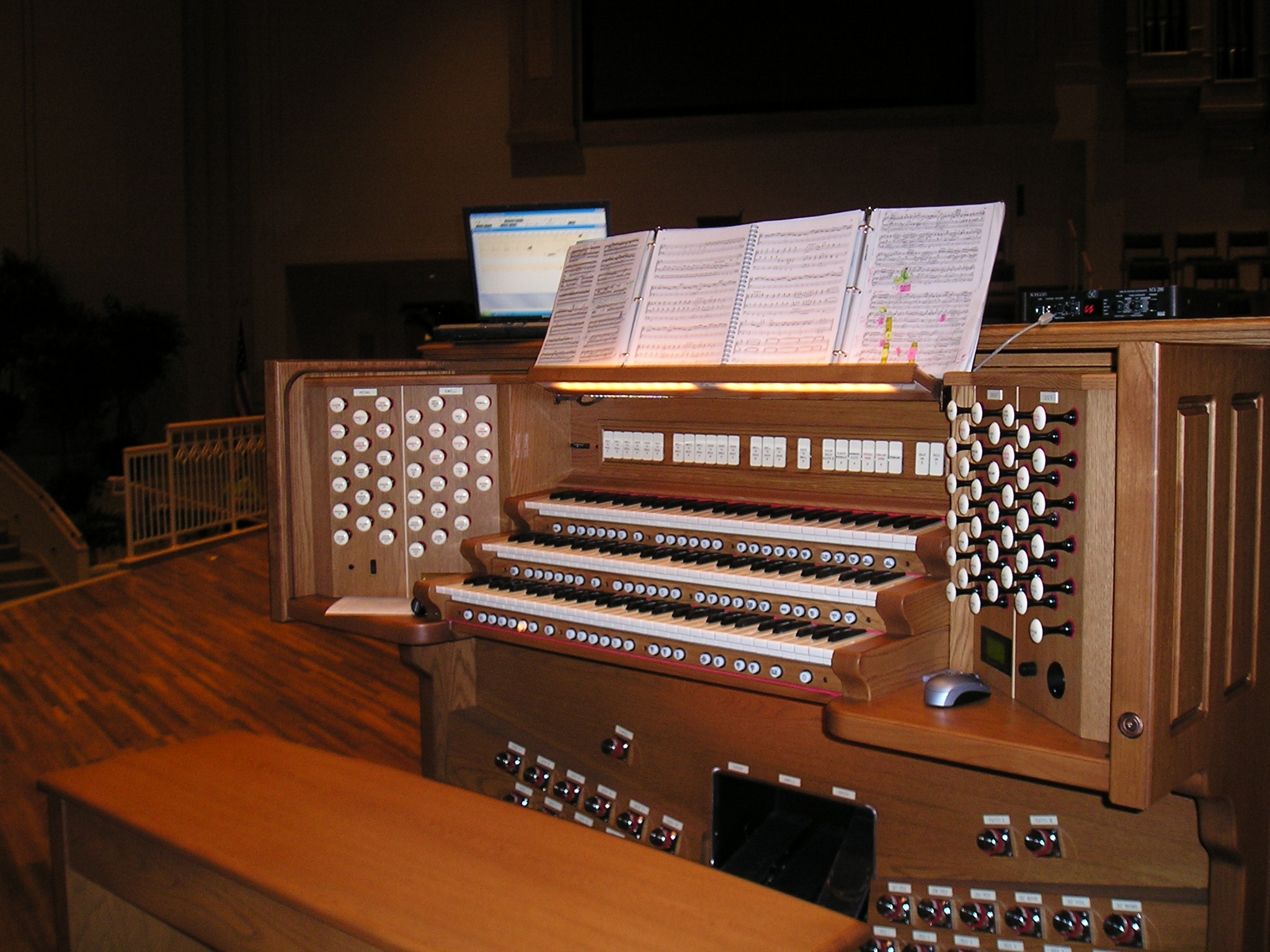
Rodgers Trillium organ custom three-manual console on a church.
right top: a sound module for extra pipe and orchestral sounds.
left top: a laptop PC for sequencing the organ.

An electric organ, also known as electronic organ, is an electronic keyboard instrument which was derived from the harmonium, pipe organ and theatre organ. Originally designed to imitate their sound, or orchestral sounds, it has since developed into several types of instruments:

- Hammond-style organs used in many styles of popular music including Pop, Rock, Country, Blues, Gospel and Jazz;
- digital church organs, which imitate pipe organs and are used primarily in churches;
- other types including combo organs, home organs, and software organs.

== History ==
=== Predecessors ===
Harmonium

The immediate predecessor of the electronic organ was the harmonium, or reed organ, an instrument that was common in homes and small churches in the late 19th and early 20th centuries. In a fashion not totally unlike that of pipe organs, reed organs generate sound by forcing air over a set of reeds by means of a bellows, usually operated by constantly pumping a set of pedals. The Harmonium used pressure, and the American reed organ or pump organ used suction. While reed organs have limited tonal quality, they are small, inexpensive, self-powered, transportable and self-contained. (Large models were made with multiple manuals, or even pedal boards; in the latter case, the bellows were operated by a leaver or crank on the side by an assistant, or in some late models an electric pump.) The reed organ is thus able to bring an organ sound to venues that are incapable of housing or affording pipe organs. This concept played an important role in the development of the electric organ.

Pipe organ

In the 1930s, several manufacturers developed electronic organs designed to imitate the function and sound of pipe organs. At the time, some manufacturers thought that emulation of the pipe organ was the most promising route to take in the development of an electronic organ. Not all agreed, however. Various types of electronic organs have been brought to market over the years, with some establishing solid reputations in their own niche markets.

=== Early electric organs (1897–1930s) ===
Telharmonium

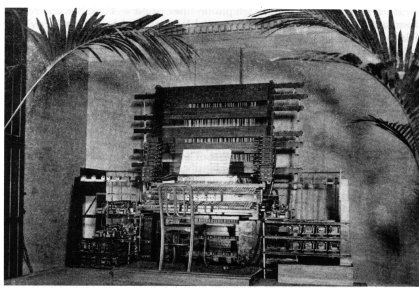
Telharmonium console by Thaddeus Cahill, 1897.

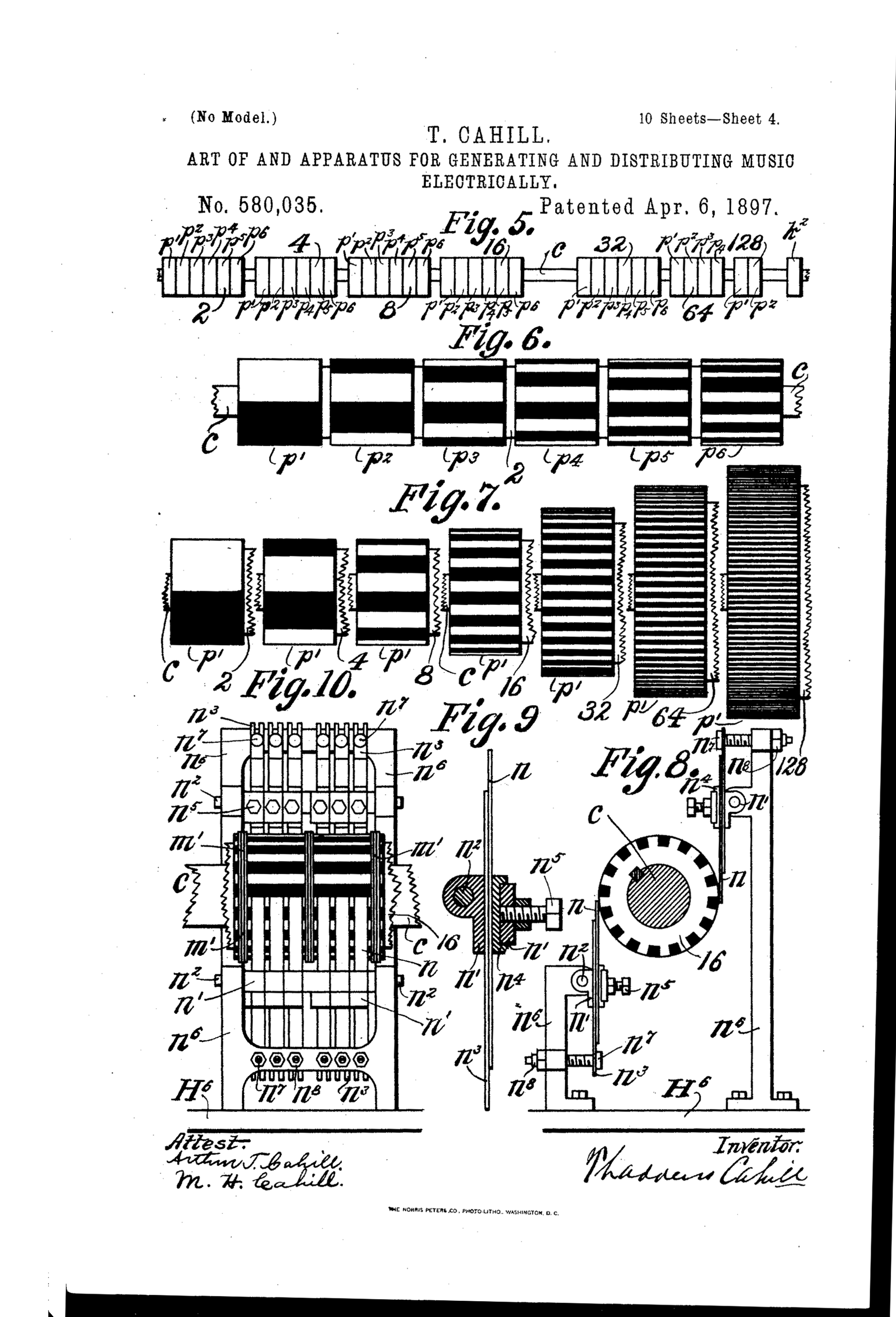
Tonewheels

The use of electricity in organs emerged in the first decades of the 20th century, but it was slow to have a major impact. Electrically powered reed organs appeared during the first decades of electricity, but their tonal qualities remained much the same as the older, foot-pumped models.

Thaddeus Cahill's gargantuan and controversial instrument, the Telharmonium, which began piping music to New York City establishments over the telephone system in 1897, predated the advent of electronics, yet was the first instrument to demonstrate the use of the combination of many different pure electrical waveforms to synthesize real-world instrument sounds. Cahill's techniques were later used by Laurens Hammond in his organ design, and the 200-ton Telharmonium served as the world's first demonstration of electrically produced music on a grand scale.

Meanwhile, some further experimentation with producing sound by electric impulses was taking place, especially in France.

=== Tonewheel organs (1930s–1975) ===
Robb Wave Organ

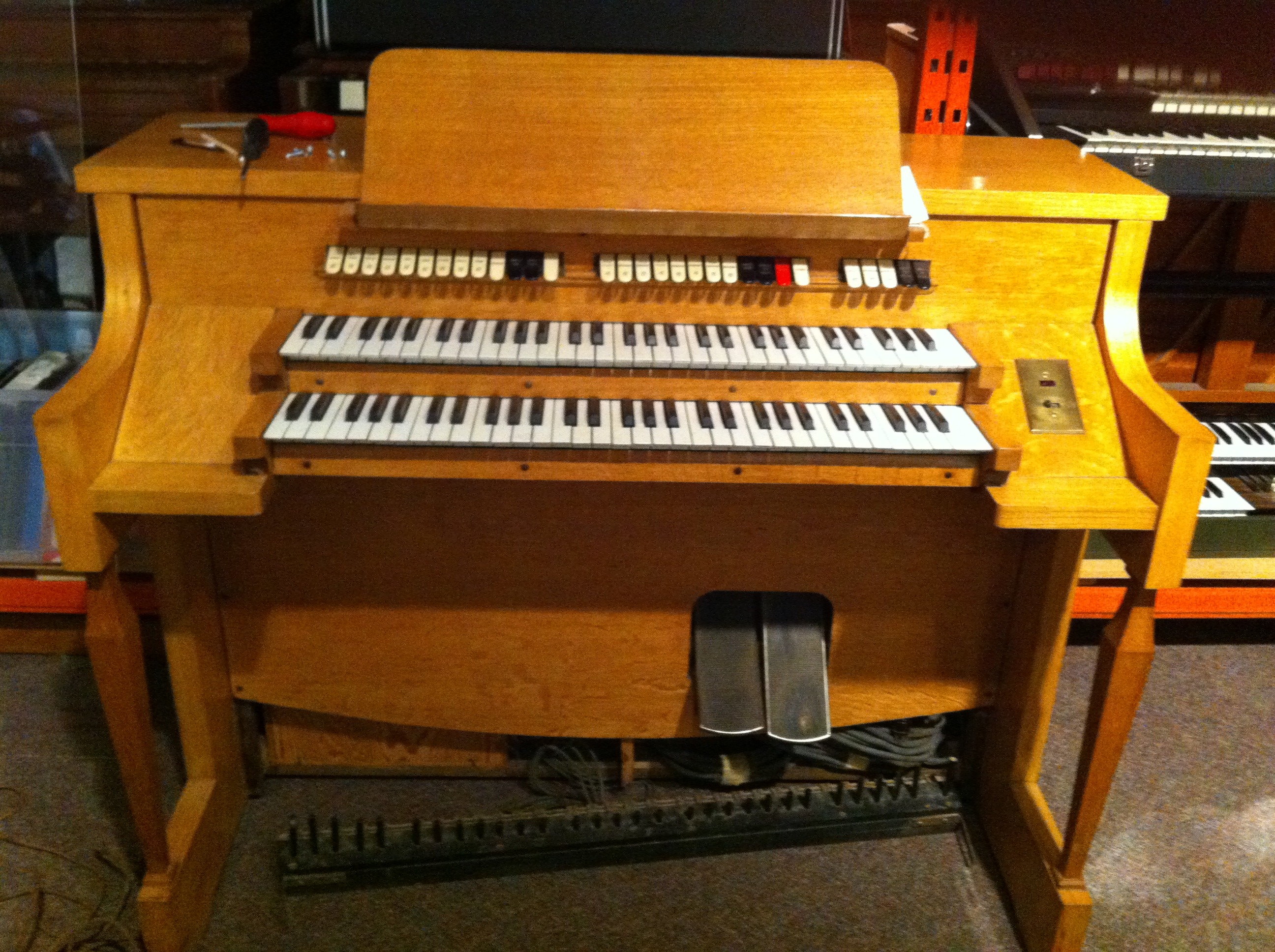
Console

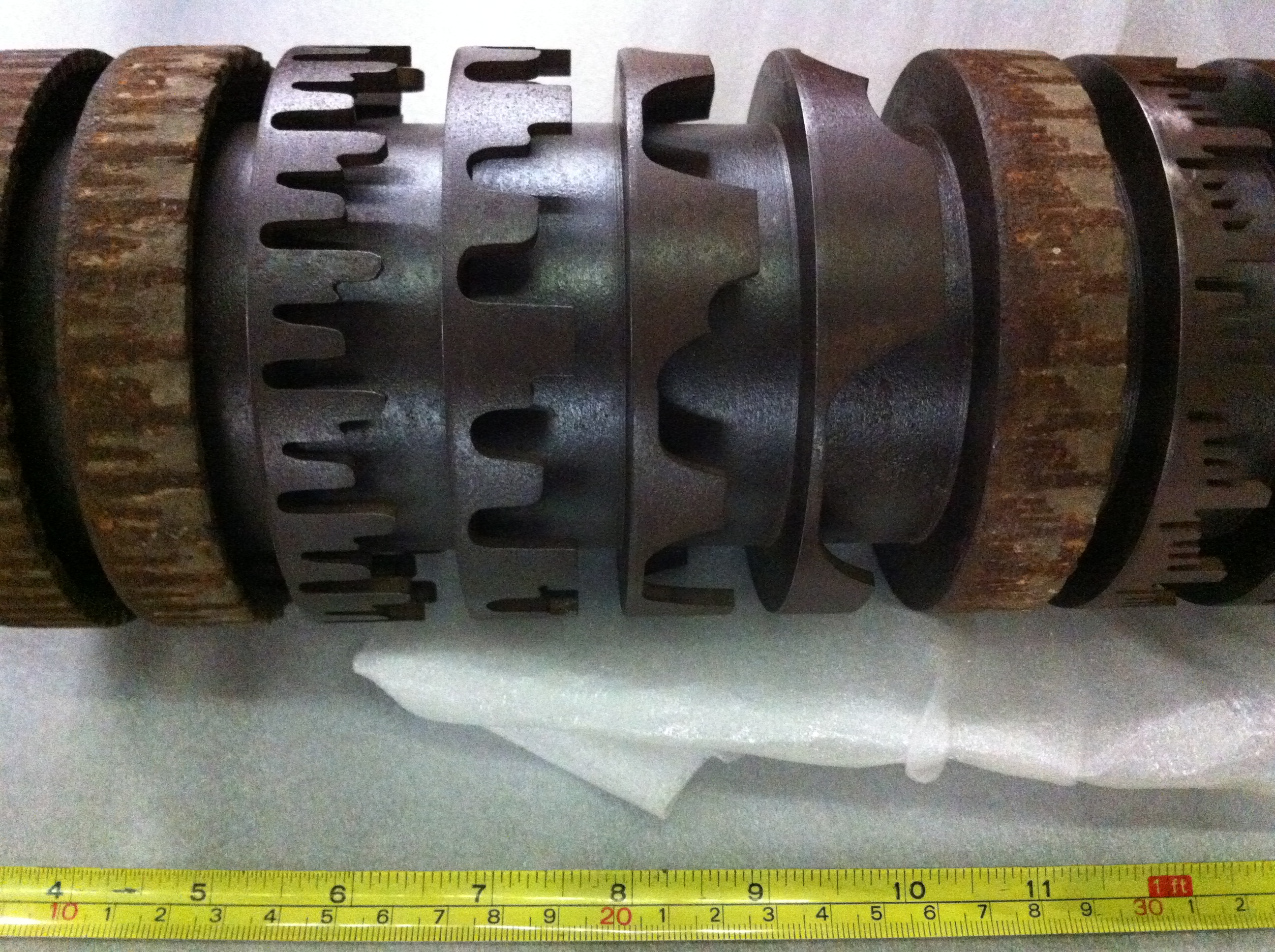
Tonewheels

Welte Lichtton Orgel

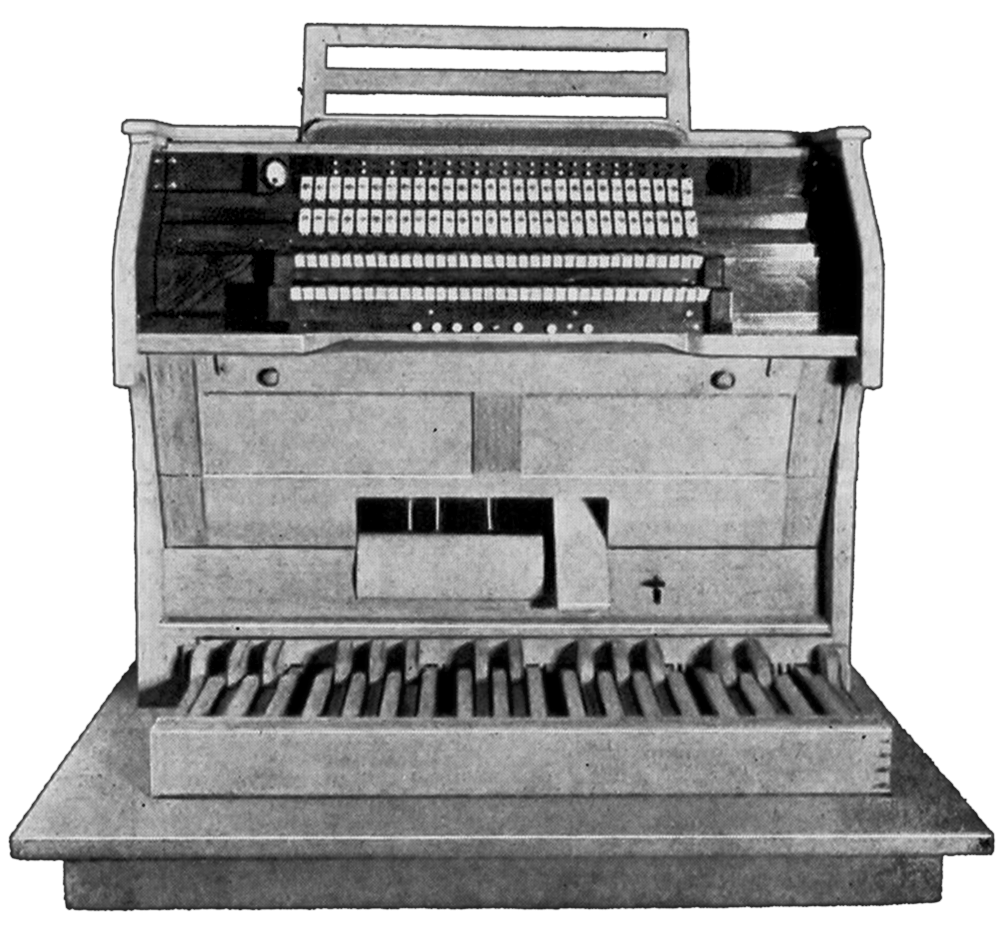
Console

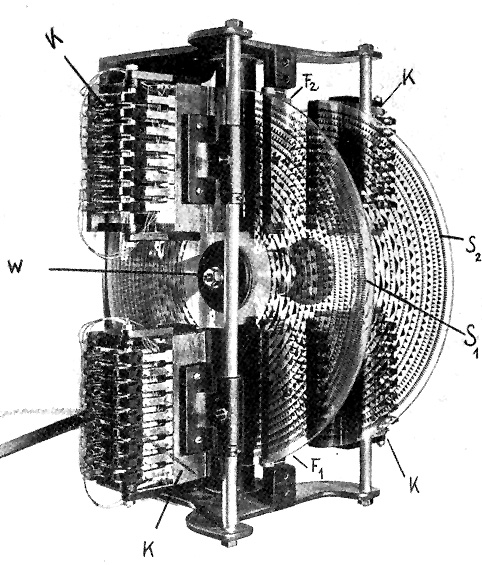
Optical-tonewheels

After the failure of the Telharmonium business, similar designs called tonewheel organs were continuously developed; For example:

- Robb Wave Organ by Morse Robb (Canada) — developed since c.1923, marketed 1936–1941
- Rangertone by Richard Ranger (United States) — marketed c.1932
- Hammond organ by Laurens Hammond and John M. Hanert (United States) — invented in 1934, marketed 1935–1975 (as the tonewheel organs)
- Lichtton Orgel by Edwin Welte, et al. (Germany) — optical-tonewheel sampling organ, marketed 1935–1940s

One of the earlier electric tonewheel organs was conceived and manufactured by Morse Robb, of the Robb Wave Organ Company. Built in Belleville, Ontario, the Robb Wave Organ predates its much more successful competitor Hammond by patent and manufacture, but shut down its operations in 1938 due to lack of funding.

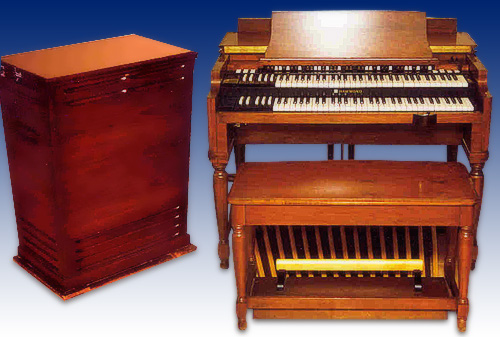
A typical tonewheel organ, Hammond B3, as well as a leslie speaker.

Hammond organ

Tonewheel (right) rotates beneath
electro-magnetic pickup (left)

Hammond drawbars

The first widespread success in this field was a product of the Hammond Clock Company in 1934. The Hammond organ quickly became the successor of the reed organ, displacing it almost completely.

From the start, tonewheel organs operated on a radically different principle from all previous organs. In place of reeds and pipes, Robb and Hammond introduced a set of rapidly spinning magnetic wheels, called tonewheels, which excite transducers that generate electrical signals of various frequencies that are mixed and fed through an amplifier to a loudspeaker. The organ is electrically powered, replacing the reed organ's twin bellows pedals with a single swell (or "expression") pedal more like that of a pipe organ. Instead of having to pump at a constant rate, as had been the case with the reed organ, the organist simply varies the position of this pedal to change the volume as desired. Unlike reed organs, this gives great control over the music's dynamic range, while at the same time freeing one or both of the player's feet to play on a pedalboard, which, unlike most reed organs, electronic organs incorporate. From the beginning, the electronic organ has had a second manual, also rare among reed organs. While these features mean that the electric organ requires greater musical skills of the organist than the reed organ has, the second manual and the pedalboard along with the expression pedal greatly enhanced playing, far-surpassing the capabilities of the typical reed organ.

The most revolutionary difference in the Hammond, however, is its huge number of tonewheel settings, achieved by manipulating a system of drawbars located near the manuals. By using the drawbars, the organist can combine a variety of electrical tones and harmonics in varying proportions, thus giving the Hammond vast registration. In all, the Hammond is capable of producing more than 250 million tones. This feature, combined with the three-keyboard layout (i.e., manuals and pedalboard), the freedom of electrical power, and a wide, easily controllable range of volume, made the first electronic organs more flexible than any reed organ, or indeed any previous musical instrument except, perhaps, the pipe organ itself.

The classic Hammond sound benefits from the use of free-standing loudspeakers called tone cabinets. The sound is often further enhanced by rotating speaker units, usually manufactured by Leslie.

The Hammond Organ was widely adopted in popular genres such as jazz, gospel, pop music, and rock music. It was utilized by bands such as Emerson, Lake, and Palmer, Booker T. & the M.G.'s, and Deep Purple, among others. Occasionally the legs would be cut off these instruments to make them easier to transport from show to show. The most popular and emulated organ in the Hammond line is the B3. Although portable "clonewheel organs" started to synthesize and displace the original Hammond tonewheel design in the 1970s, it is still very much in demand by professional organists. The industry continues to see a lively trade in refurbished Hammond instruments, even as technological advances allow new organs to perform at levels unimaginable only two or three decades ago.

=== Electrostatic reed organs (1934–1964) ===
In the wake of Hammond's 1934 invention of the tonewheel organ, competitors explored other possibilities of electric/electronic organ design. Other than the variations of tonewheel organ design, for example, a purely electronic interpretation of the pipe organ (based on "additive synthesis" design) seemed a promising approach. However, it requires a huge number of oscillators, and these circuit scales and complexities were considered a technical bottleneck, as vacuum tube circuits of those days are bulky and unstable. Benjamin Miessner realized that a hybrid approach, using acoustic tone generators along with electronic circuits, could be a reasonable design for commercial products.

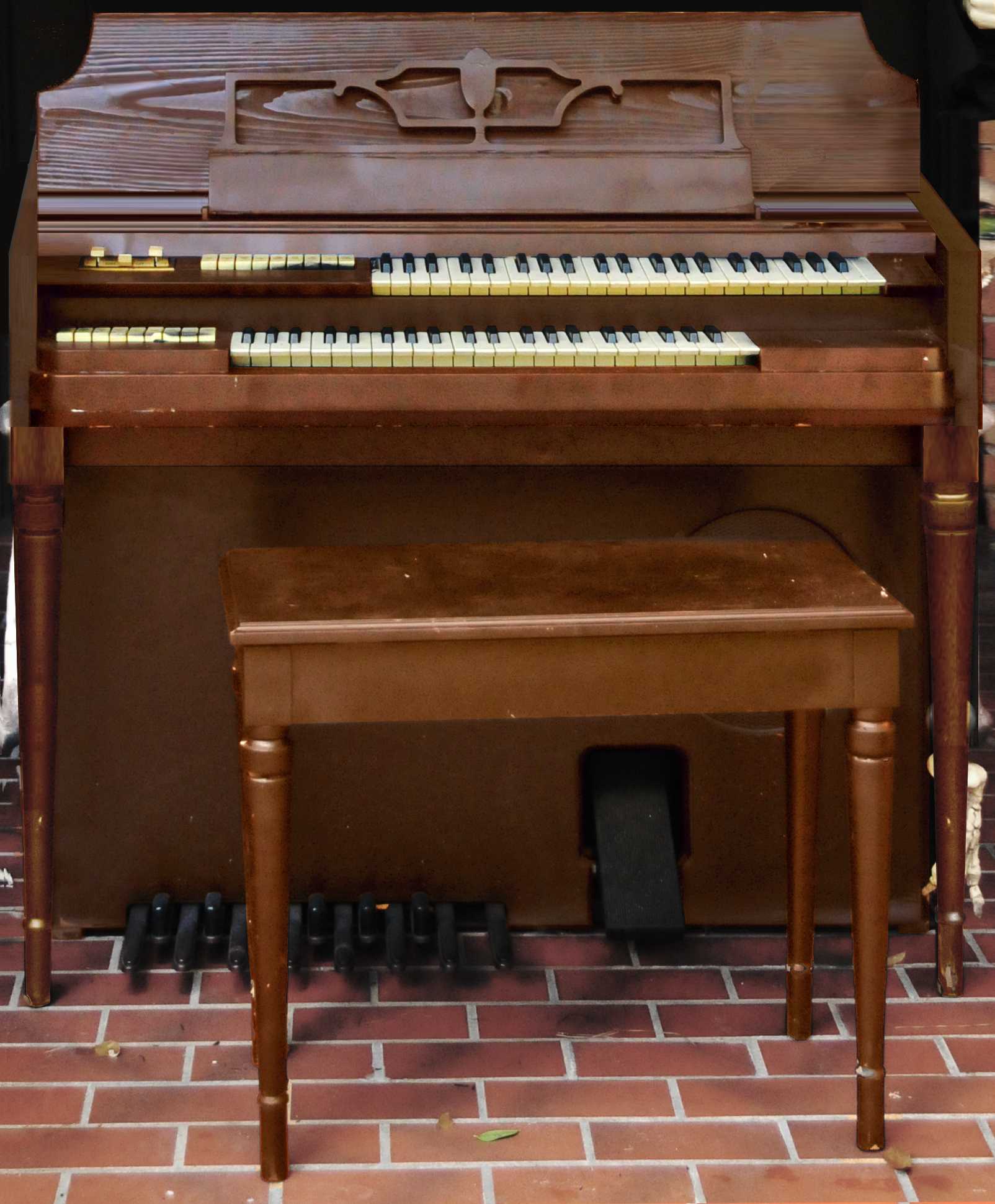
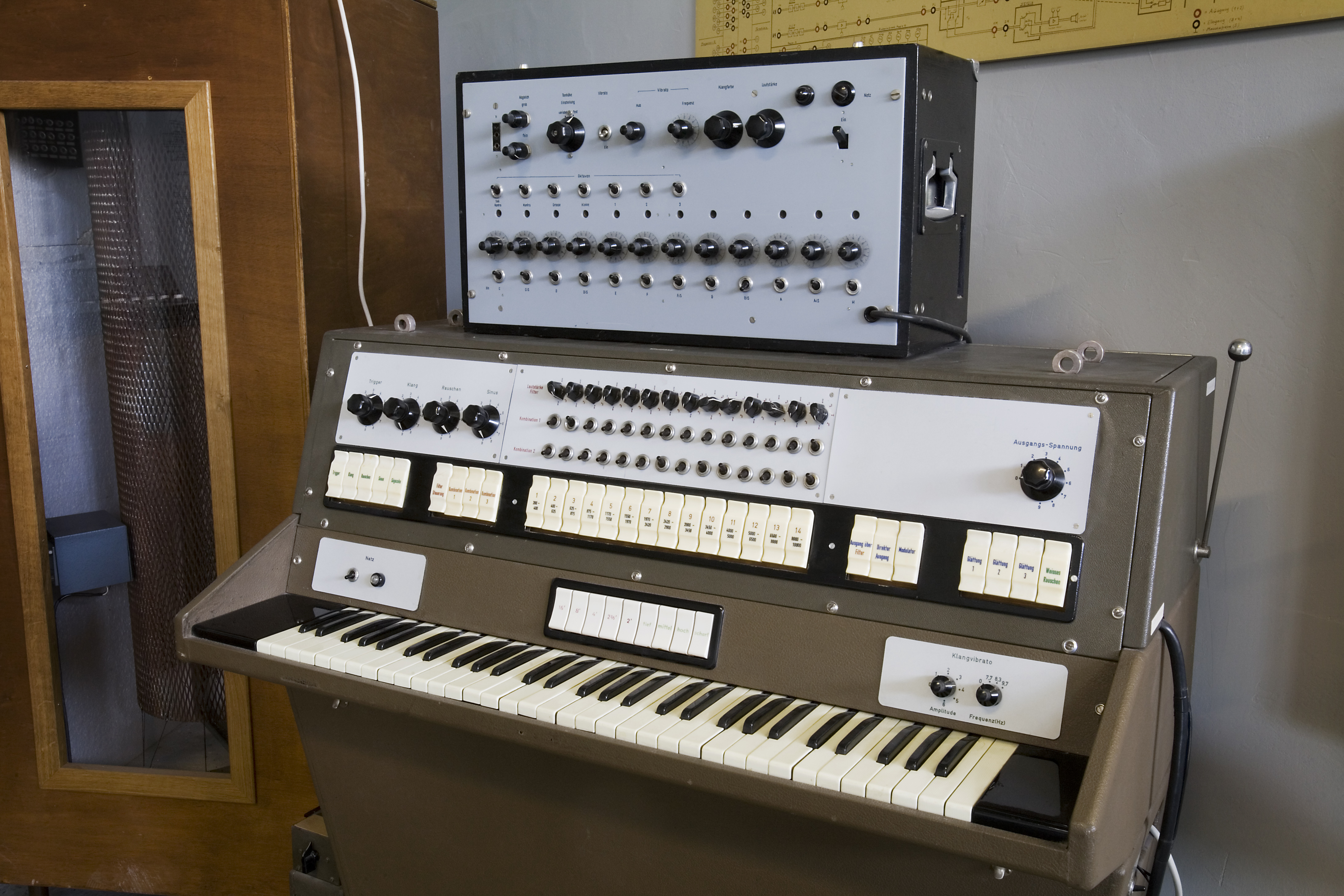
left: Wurlitzer Model 44 Electrostatic Organ (1953–1964)
right: Hohner Hohnerola (1955), highly expanded by Siemens Studio for Electronic Music.

The Orgatron was developed in 1934 by Frederick Albert Hoschke, after a Miessner patent. A fan blows air over a set of free reeds, causing them to vibrate. These vibrations are detected by a number of capacitive pickups, then the resulting electric signals are processed and amplified to create musical tones. Orgatron was manufactured by Everett Piano Company from 1935 to 1941. Following World War II and a business transfer, production resumed in 1945 by the Rudolph Wurlitzer Company and continued into the early 1960s, including some models retaining the Everett name from 1945 to 1947.

In 1955, the German company Hohner also released two electrostatic reed organs: the Hohnerola and the Minetta, invented by Ernst Zacharias.

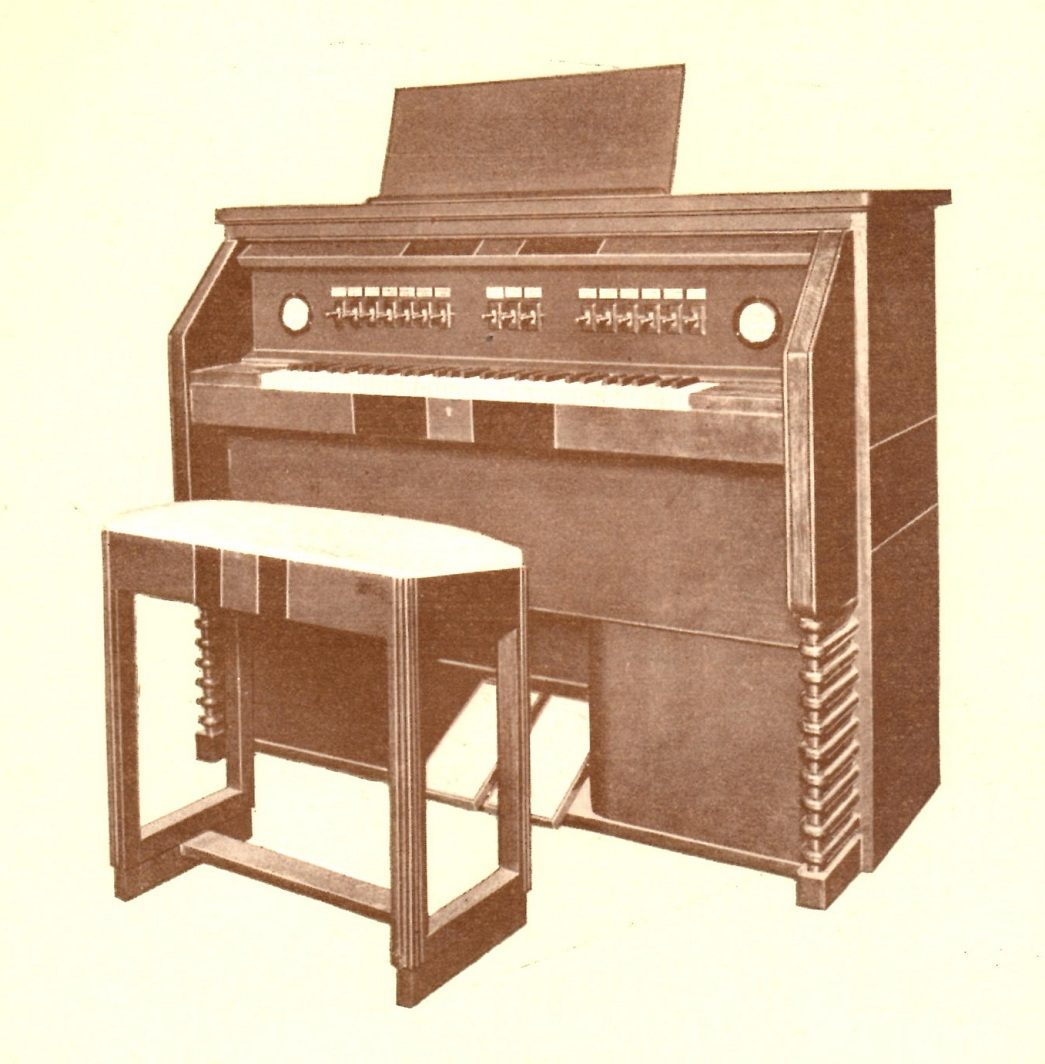
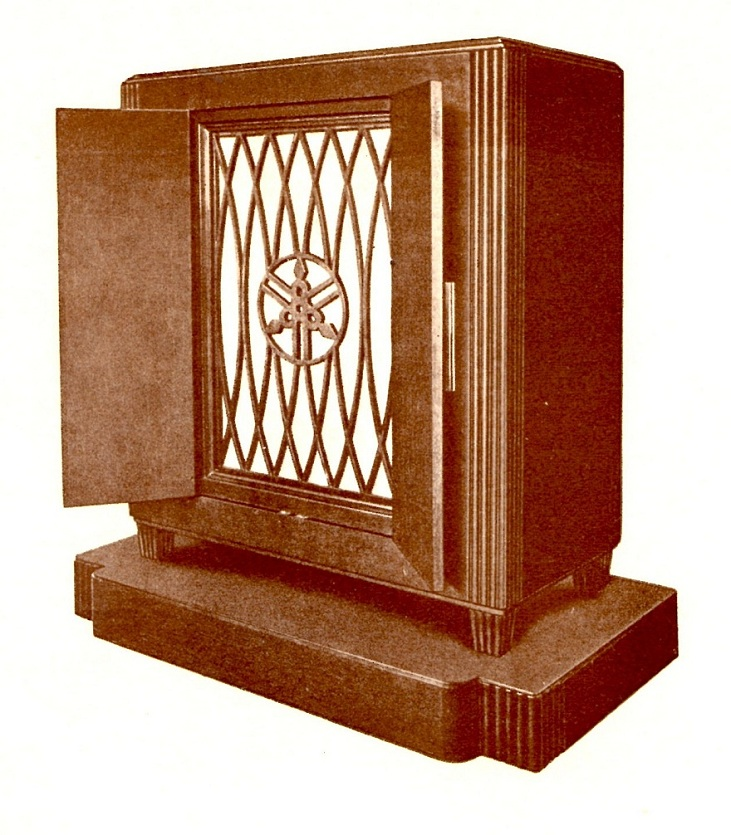
Yamaha Magna Organ & Tone Cabinet (1935)

In the same decades, similar electro-acoustic instruments — i.e. electric-fan driven free reed organs with additional electronic circuits — were developed also in Japan. Magna Organ invented in 1934 by a Yamaha engineer, Sei-ichi Yamashita, was a multi-timbral keyboard instrument similar to the Hoschke's instrument developed in the same year, although it utilized the microphones in the soundproof box instead of the electrostatic pickups. Initially the Magna Organ was designed as a kind of the additive-synthesizer that summing-up the partials generated by the frequency-multipliers. However, it seems difficult to achieve polyphony without intermodulation distortions with the technology of the 1930s. According to the additional patents and the reviews at that time, its later implemented design, seems to have shifted to a sound-colorization system using the (various) combinations of reed sets, microphones and loudspeakers.

This type of instrument was later re-commercialized: In 1959, Japanese organ builder, Ichirō Kuroda, built his first Croda Organ with each pair of constantly oscillating free reed and a microphone in the soundproof box, and installed at Nishi-Chiba Church in Chiba Prefecture.

=== Electronic organs (1930s–) ===
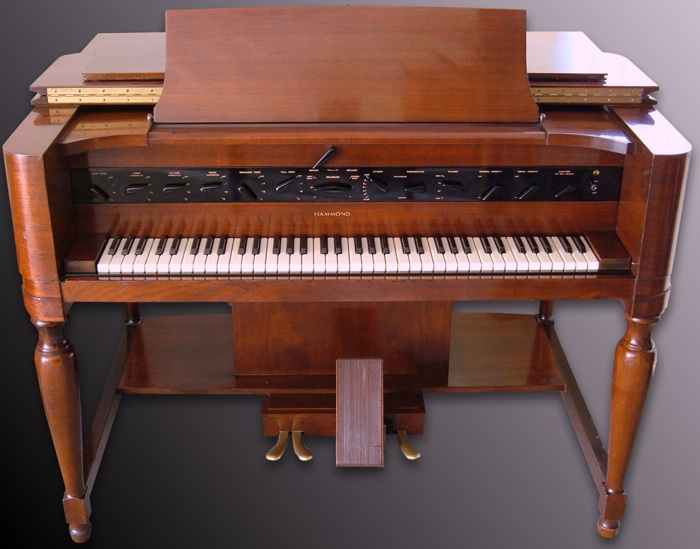
Hammond Novachord (1939)

On the other hand, the Hammond Novachord (1939) and other competitors selected the subtractive synthesis design using various combinations of oscillators, filters, and possibly frequency dividers, to reduce the huge number of oscillators, which was the bottleneck of the additive synthesis design. The heat generated by early models with vacuum tube tone generators and amplifiers led to the somewhat derogatory nickname "toaster". Today's solid-state instruments do not suffer from the problem, nor do they require the several minutes that vacuum tube organs need to bring the filament heaters up to temperature.

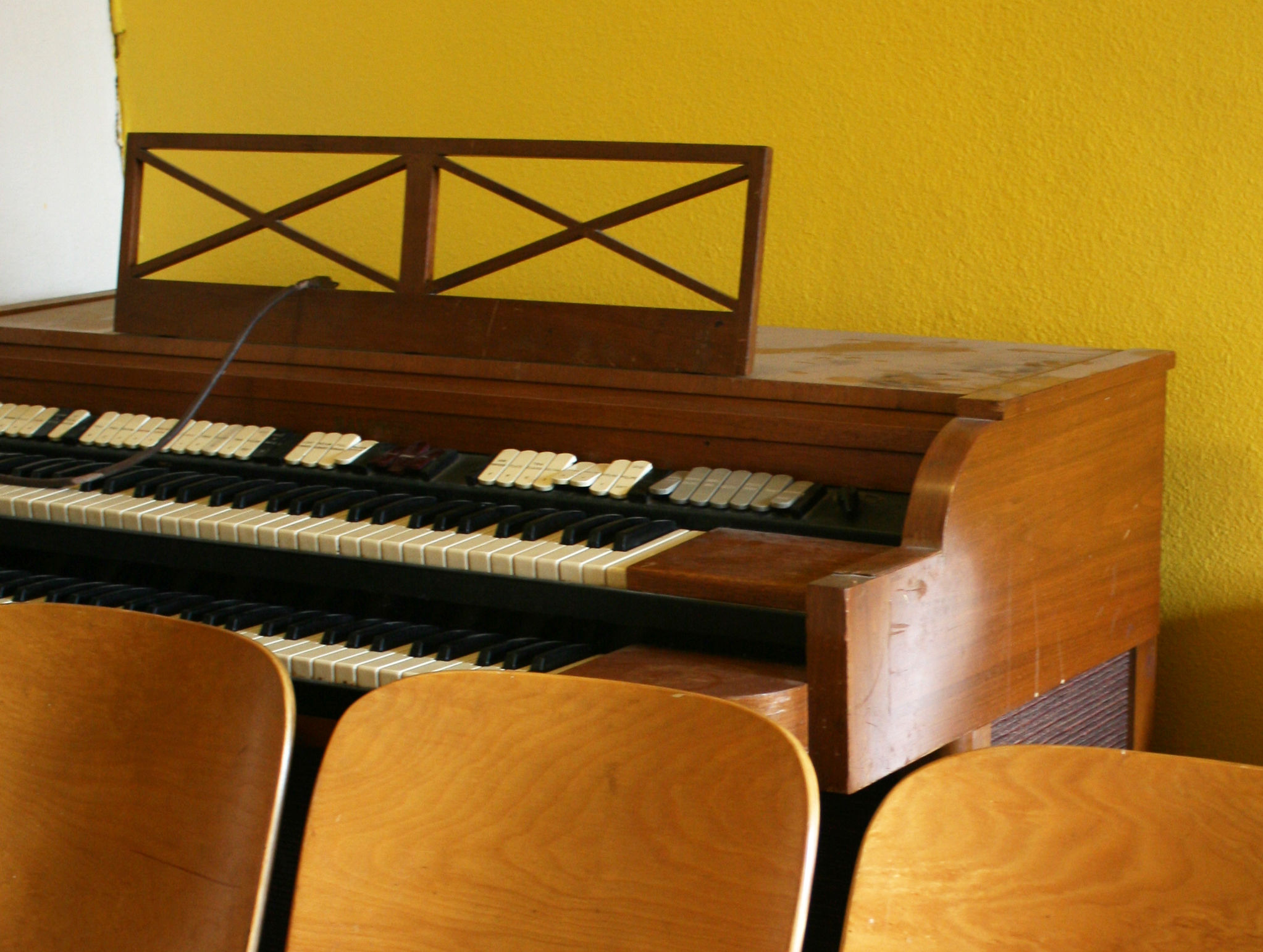
Baldwin Electronic Organ, designed by Winston E. Kock.

Electronic organs were once popular home instruments, comparable in price to pianos and frequently sold in department stores. After their début in the 1930s, they captured the public imagination through the recordings of musicians such as Milt Herth (the first performer to record the Hammond Electric Organ) as well as recordings and film performances of Ethel Smith. Nevertheless, they were promoted primarily as church / institutional instruments during the Great Depression and through World War II. After the war, they became more widespread; for example, the Baldwin Piano Company introduced its first in 1946 (with 37 vacuum tubes). Following the adaptation of solid-state electronics to organs in the late 1950s, the market for electronic organs began a fundamental change. Portable electronic keyboards became a regular feature of rock-and-roll music during the 1960s. They are also more convenient to move and store than are the large one-piece organs that had previously defined the market. By the late 1960s, the home organ market was dying while the portable keyboard market was thriving.

=== Frequency divider organs (1930s–) ===
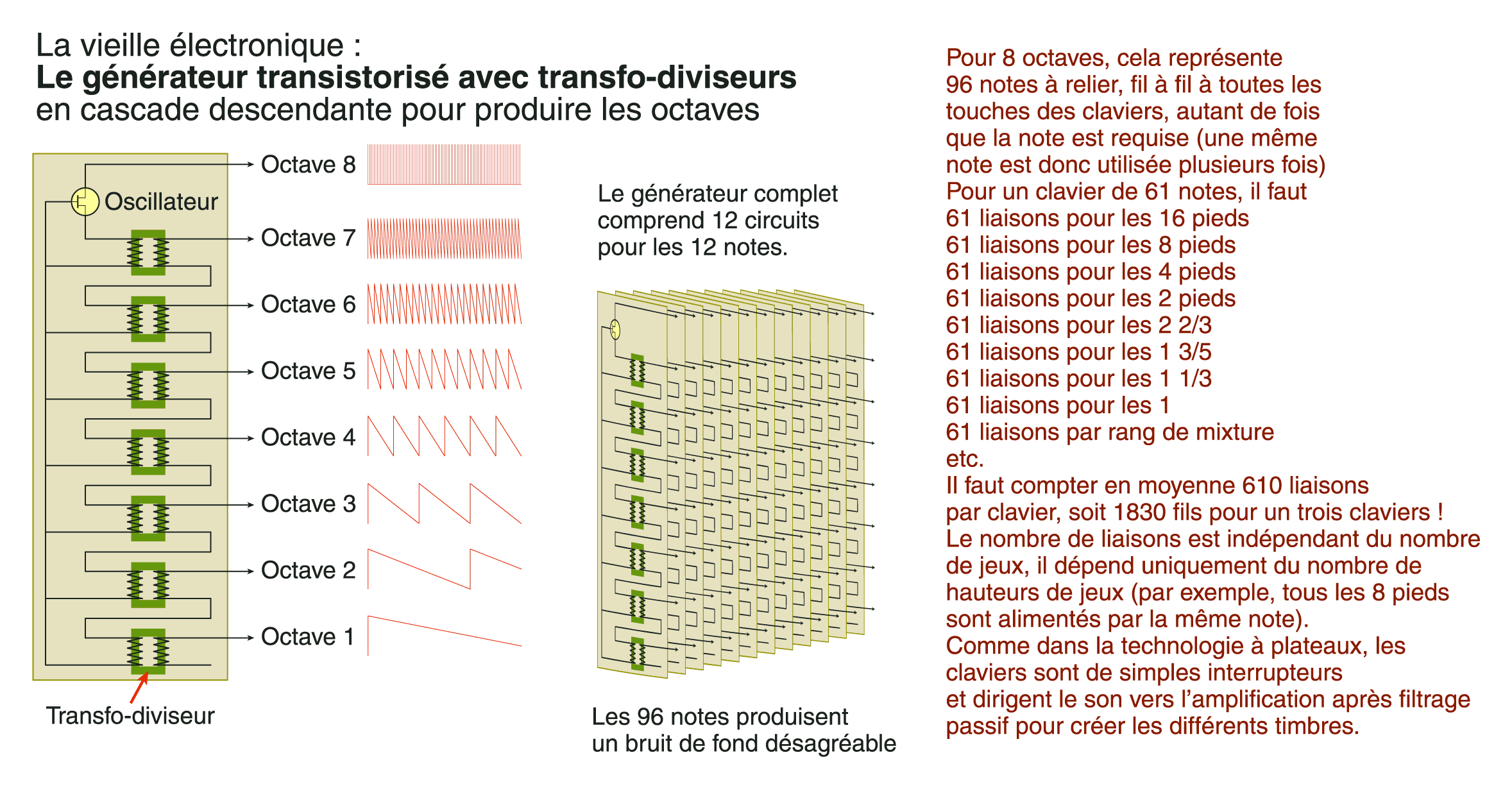
Generalized schematic of frequency divider organs with transformer-dividers (in French)

Early electronic organ products released in the 1930s and 1940s were already implemented on frequency divider technology using vacuum tubes or transformer-dividers.

With the development of the transistor, electronic organs that use no mechanical parts to generate the waveforms became practical. The first of these was the frequency divider organ, the first of which uses twelve oscillators to produce one octave of chromatic scale, and frequency dividers to produce other notes. These were even cheaper and more portable than the Hammond. Later developments made it possible to run an organ from a single radio frequency oscillator. Frequency divider organs were built by many companies, and were offered in kit form to be built by hobbyists. A few of these have seen notable use, such as the Lowrey played by Garth Hudson. The design of the Lowrey's electronics made it easy to include a pitch-bend feature that is unavailable for the Hammond, and Hudson built a musical style around its use.

=== Console organs (1930s–) ===
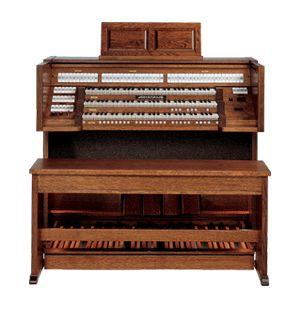
A typical modern console organ (Johannus Sweelinck 35)

Console organs, large and expensive electronic organ models, resemble pipe organ consoles. These instruments have a more traditional configuration, including full-range manuals, a wider variety of stops, and a two-octave (or occasionally even a full 32-note) pedalboard easily playable by both feet in standard toe-and-heel fashion. (Console organs having 32-note pedalboards are sometimes known as "concert organs".) Console models, like spinet and chord organs, have internal speakers mounted above the pedals. With their more traditional configuration, greater capabilities, and better performance compared to spinets, console organs are especially suitable for use in small churches, public performance, and even organ instruction. The home musician or student who first learned to play on a console model often found that he or she could later make the transition to a pipe organ in a church setting with relative ease. College music departments made console organs available as practice instruments for students, and church musicians would not uncommonly have them at home.

=== Home organs (1940s–) ===
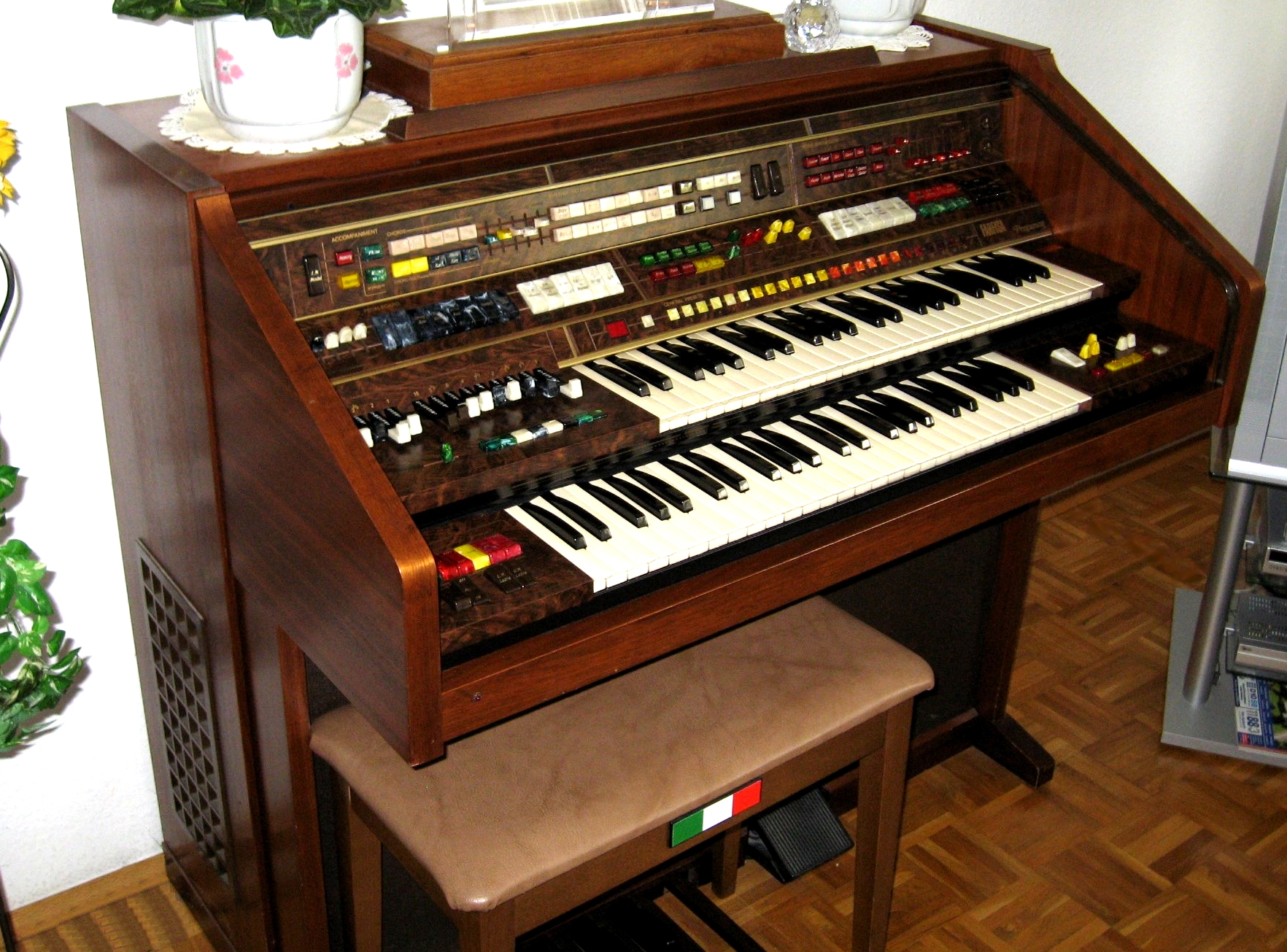
A full-featured home organ in 1981 (Farfisa Pergamon)

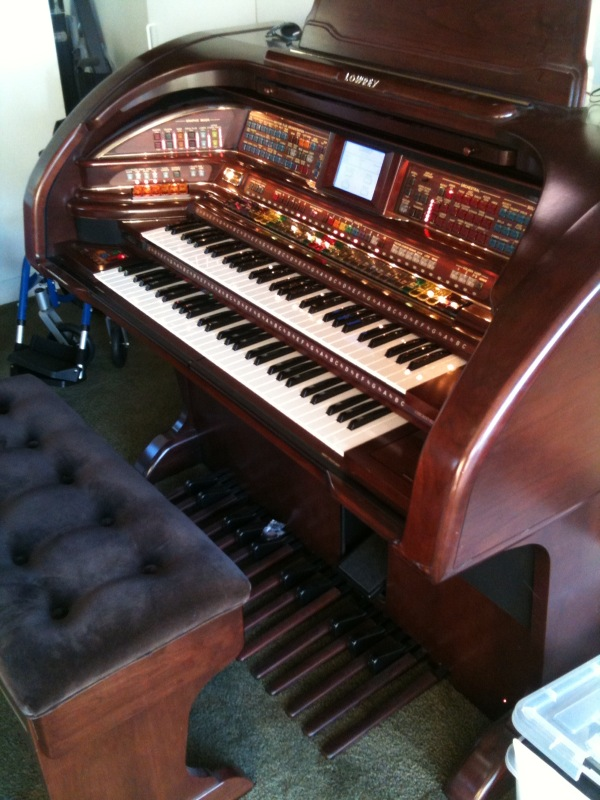
A Lowrey organ (high-end model)

During the period from the 1940s through approximately the 1970s, a variety of more modest self-contained electronic home organs from a variety of manufacturers were popular forms of home entertainment. These instruments were much influenced by theatre organs' sounds and playing style, and often the stops contained imitative voicings such as "trumpet" and "marimba". In the 1950s–1970s, as technology progressed, they increasingly included automated features such as:

- Repeat percussion (Thomas Organ)
- Sustain (Gulbransen)
- Glide (Lowrey organ in 1956) — a foot-operated switch temporarily lowers the pitch by about a semitone, to simulate a slide on Hawaiian guitar or trombone.
- Chimes stop / Piano stop (Gulbransen)
- Vocal chorus (Farfisa Pergamon in 1981)
- Electronic rhythm (Wurlitzer Sideman in 1959, Seeburg & Gulbransen in 1964)
- One-touch chords (Hammond S-6 Chord Organ in 1950)
- Automatic Orchestra Control (Lowrey organ in 1963) — turns a single note (on upper manual) into a full chord (designated on lower manual).
- Autochord (Hammond Piper in 1970, Lowrey Magic Genie in c.1975)
- Automatic walking bass (Gulbransen)
- Arpeggiator (Hammond organ, etc.)
- Built-in Leslie speaker / Rotary speaker (Gulbransen, Lowrey Holiday Deluxe LSL in 1961, etc.)

and even built-in tape recorders. These features made it easier to play complete, layered "one-man band" arrangements, especially for people who had not trained as organists. The Lowrey line of home organs is the epitome of this type of instrument.

While a few such instruments are still sold today, their popularity has waned greatly, and many of their functions have been incorporated into more modern and inexpensive portable keyboards.

Typical features on Home organs

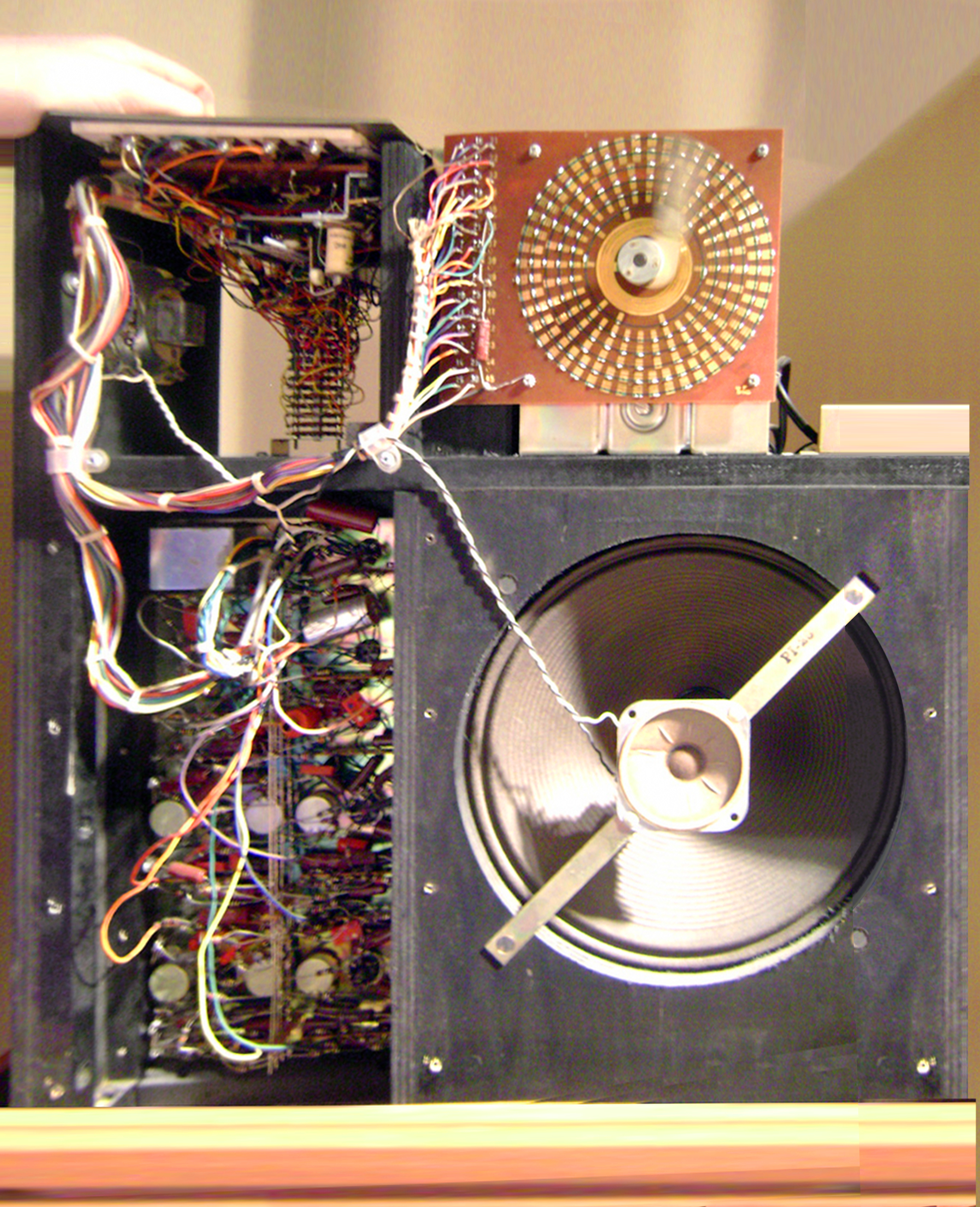
an earliest external Rhythm machine, Wurlitzer Sideman (1957, inside)

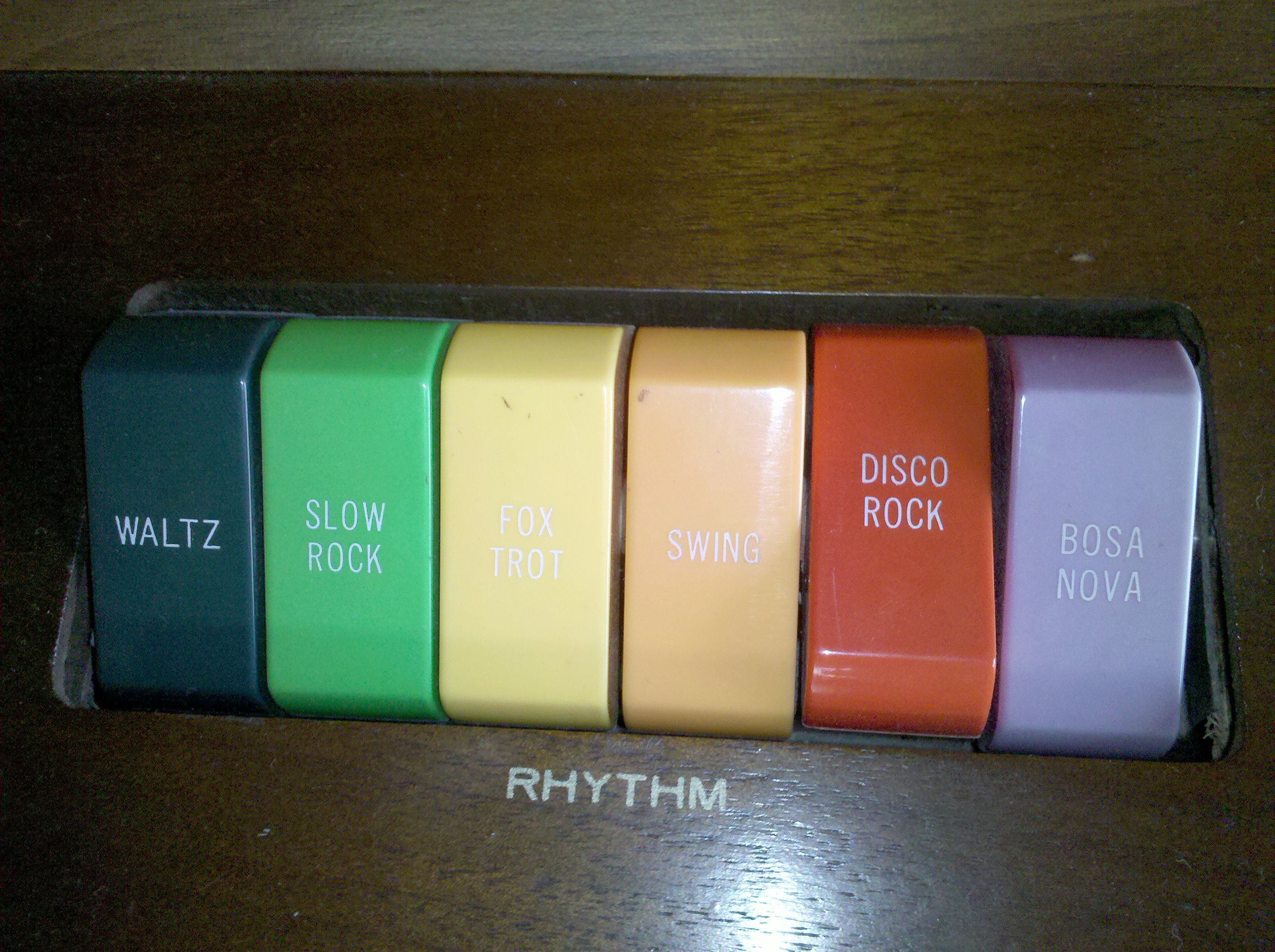
built-in Rhythm selector

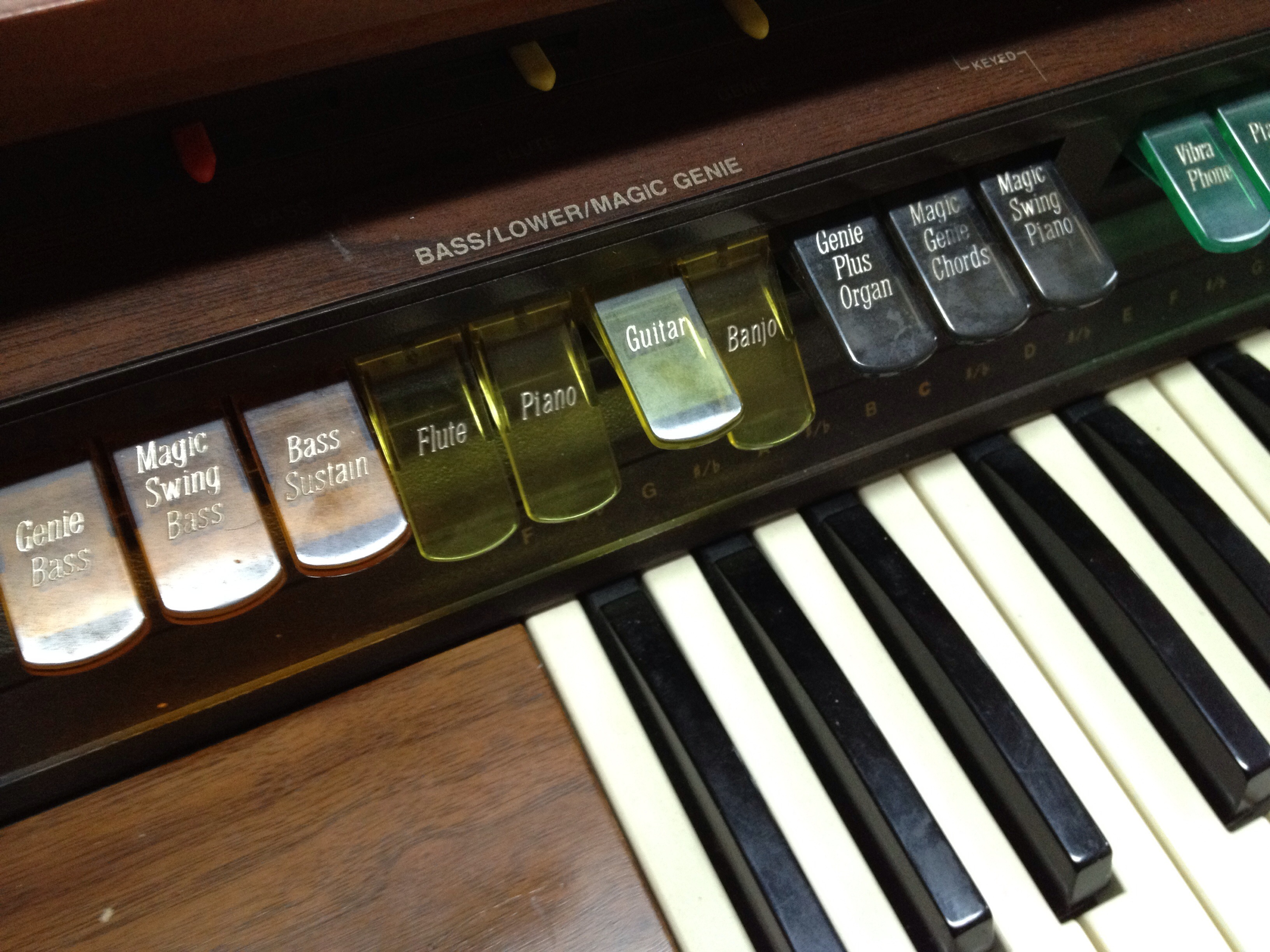
Automatic accompani-ment (bass & chord) on Lowrey Magic Genie

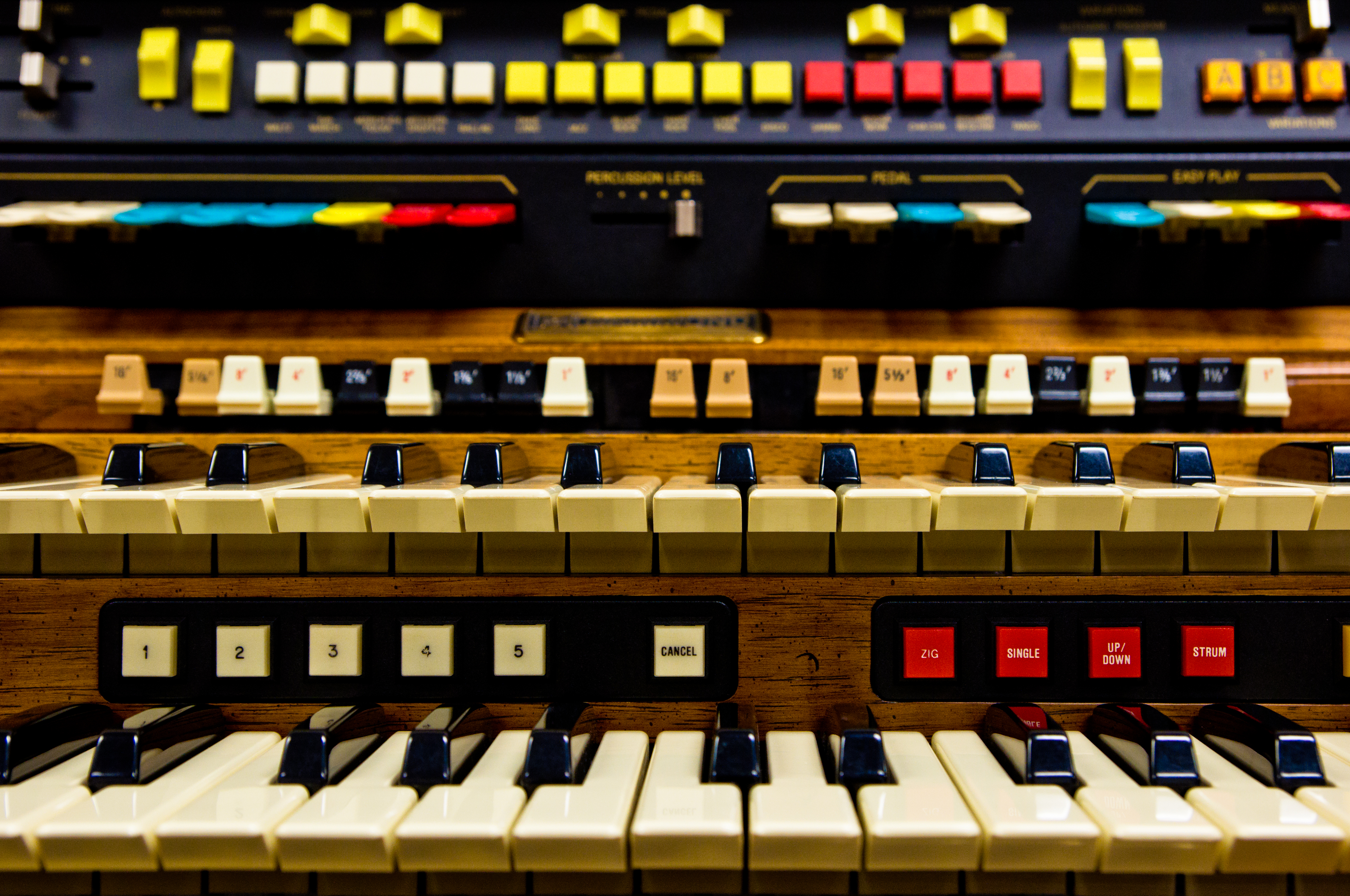
Arpeggiator buttons (in red, bottom-right) on Hammond Colonnade

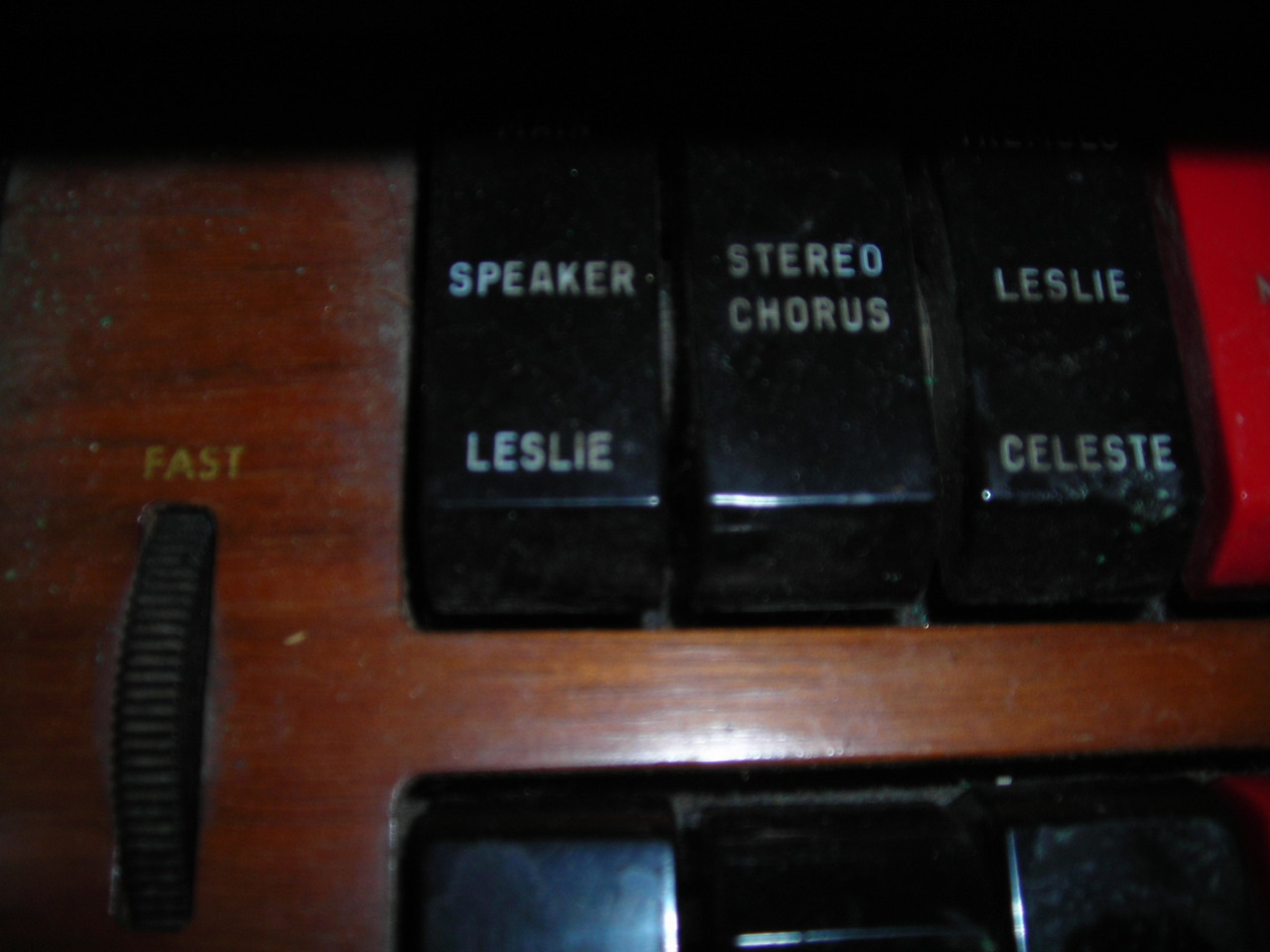
built-in Leslie & Chorus controller

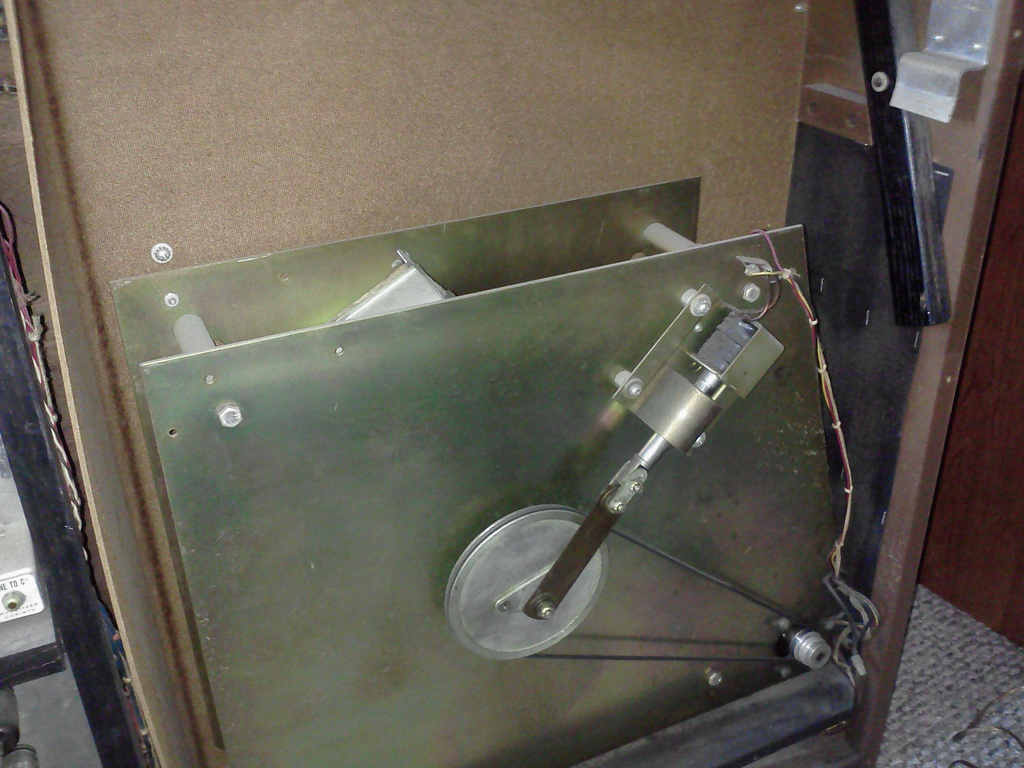
built-in Rotary speaker on Wurlitzer 4100BW

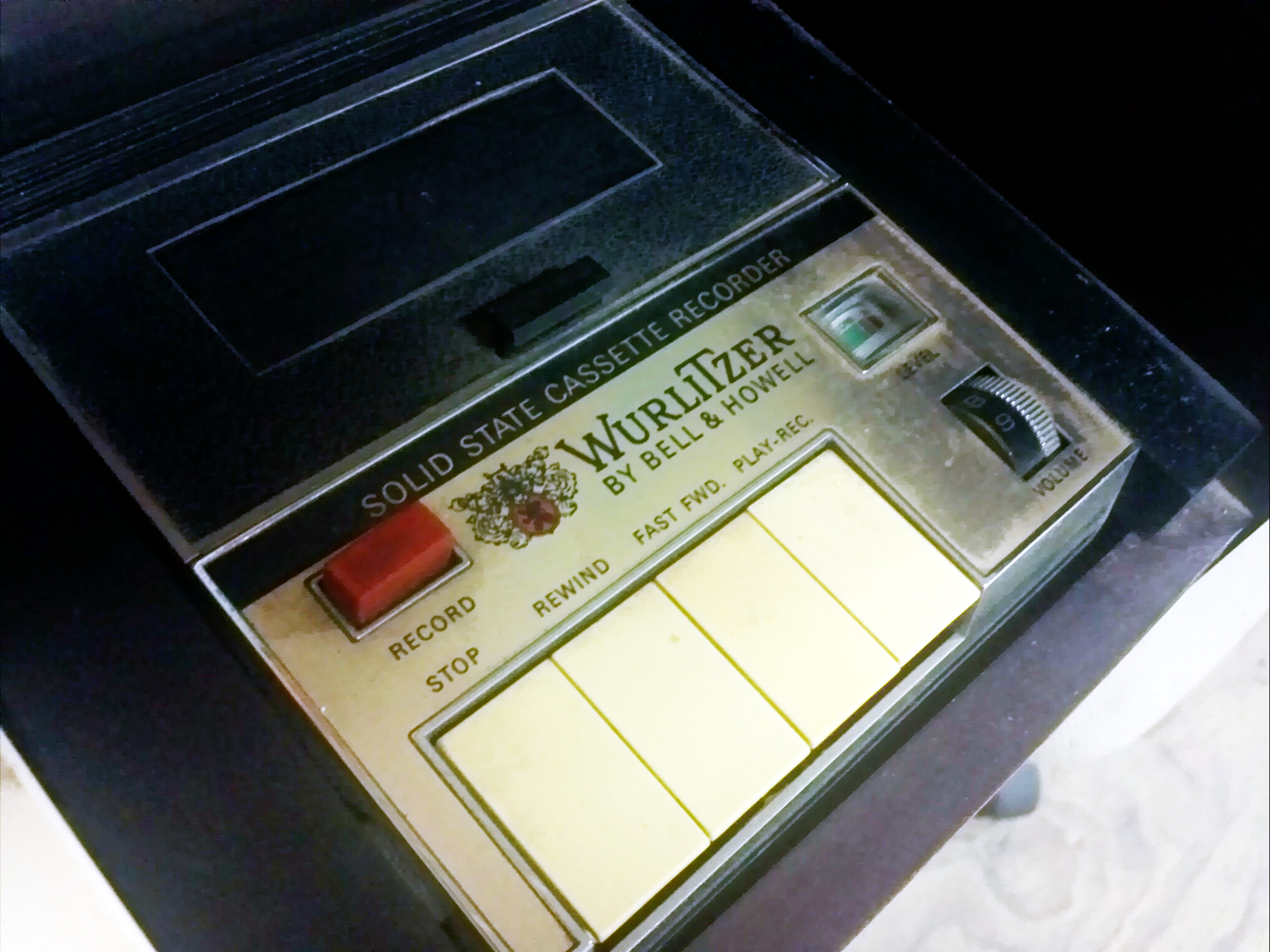
built-in Tape recorders on Wurlitzer 4022D

=== Spinet organs (1949–) ===
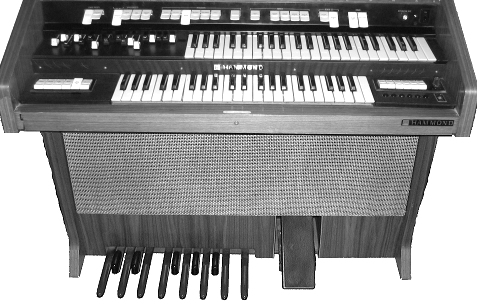
A Typical Spinet organ (Hammond TR-200) has two short manuals arranged with offset. A spinet organ's pedalboard spanned only a single octave.

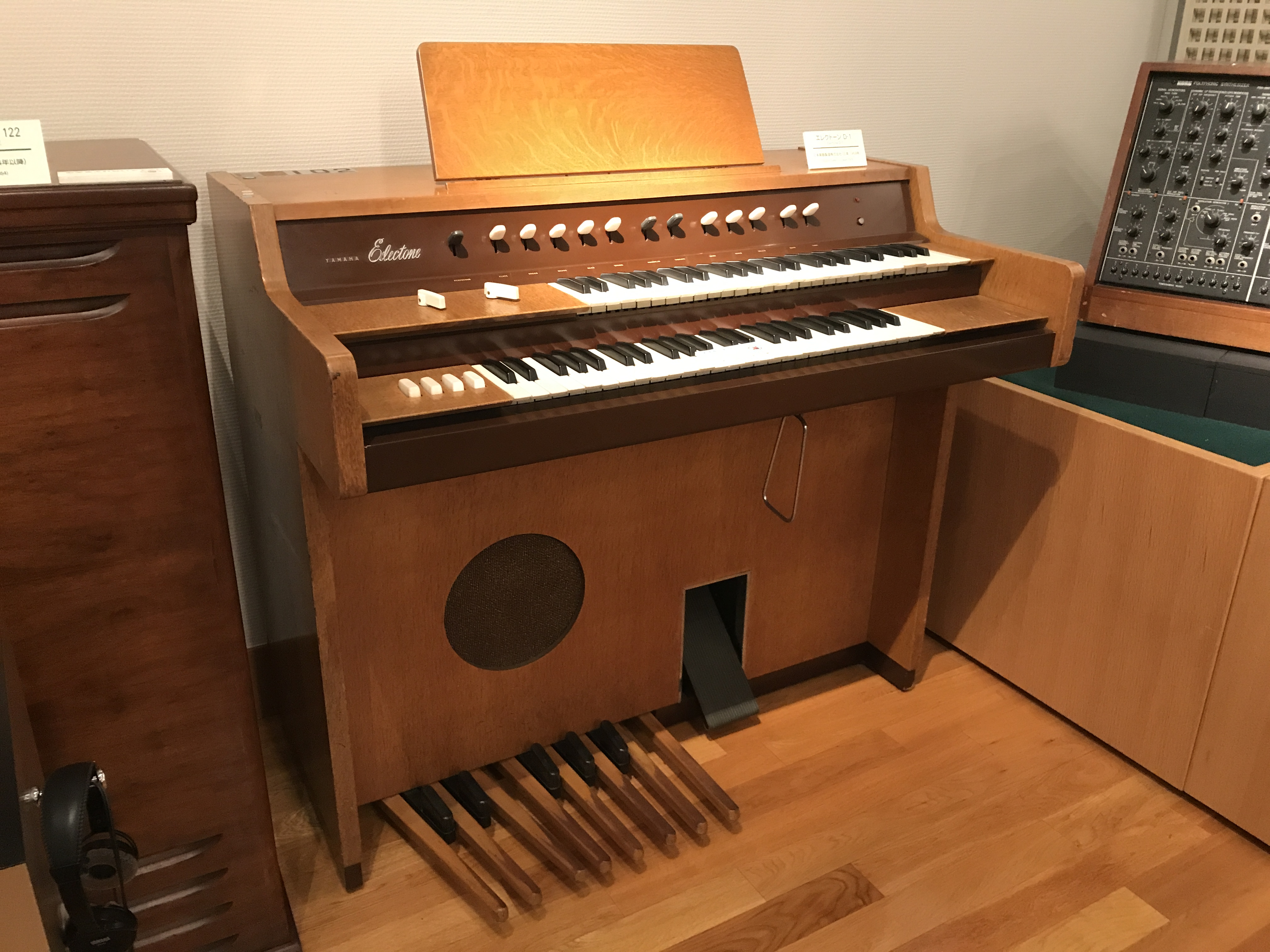
Yamaha's first Electone organ, D-1 (1959), were based on a spinet model.

Following World War II, most electronic home organs were built in a configuration usually called a spinet organ, which first appeared in 1949. These compact and relatively inexpensive instruments became the natural successors to reed organs. They were marketed as competitors of home pianos and often aimed at would-be home organists who were already pianists (hence the name "spinet", in the sense of a small upright piano). The instrument's design reflected this concept: the spinet organ physically resembled a piano, and it presented simplified controls and functions that were both less expensive to produce and less intimidating to learn. One feature of the spinet is automatic chord generation; with many models, the organist can produce an entire chord to accompany the melody merely by playing the tonic note, i.e., a single key, on a special section of the manual.

On spinet organs, the keyboards are typically at least an octave shorter than is normal for organs, with the upper manual (typically 44 notes, F3–C7 in scientific pitch notation) omitting the bass, and the lower manual (typically F2–C6) omitting the treble. The manuals are usually offset, inviting but not requiring the new organist to dedicate the right hand to the upper manual and the left to the lower, rather than using both hands on a single manual. The stops on the upper manual were often 'voiced' somewhat louder or brighter, and user guides encouraged playing the melody on the upper manual and the harmony on the lower. This seemed designed in part to encourage the pianist, who was accustomed to a single keyboard, to make use of both manuals. Stops on such instruments, relatively limited in number, are frequently named after orchestral instruments that they can, at best, only roughly approximate, and are often brightly colored (even more so than those of theatre organs). The spinet organ's loudspeakers, unlike the original Hammond models of the 1930s and 1940s, are housed within the main instrument (behind the kickboard), which saved even more space, although they produce a sound inferior to that of free-standing speakers; some models had jacks for installing external speakers, if desired.

The spinet organ's pedalboard normally spans only a single octave, is often incapable of playing more than one note at a time, and is effectively playable only with the left foot (and on some models only with the left toes). These limitations, combined with the shortened manuals, make the spinet organ all but useless for performing or practicing classical organ music; but at the same time, it allows the novice home organist to explore the challenge and flexibility of simultaneously playing three keyboards (two hands and one foot). User guides suggest playing the root note of the chord on the pedal. The expression pedal is located to the right and either partly or fully recessed within the kickboard, thus conveniently reachable only with the right foot. This arrangement spawned a style of casual organist who would naturally rest the right foot on the expression pedal the entire time, unlike classically trained organists or performers on the earlier Hammonds. This position, in turn, instinctively encouraged pumping of the expression pedal while playing, especially if already accustomed to using a piano's sustain pedal to shape the music. Expressive pumping added a strong dynamic element to home organ music that much classical literature and hymnody lacked, and would help influence a new generation of popular keyboard artists.

=== Chord organs (1950–) ===
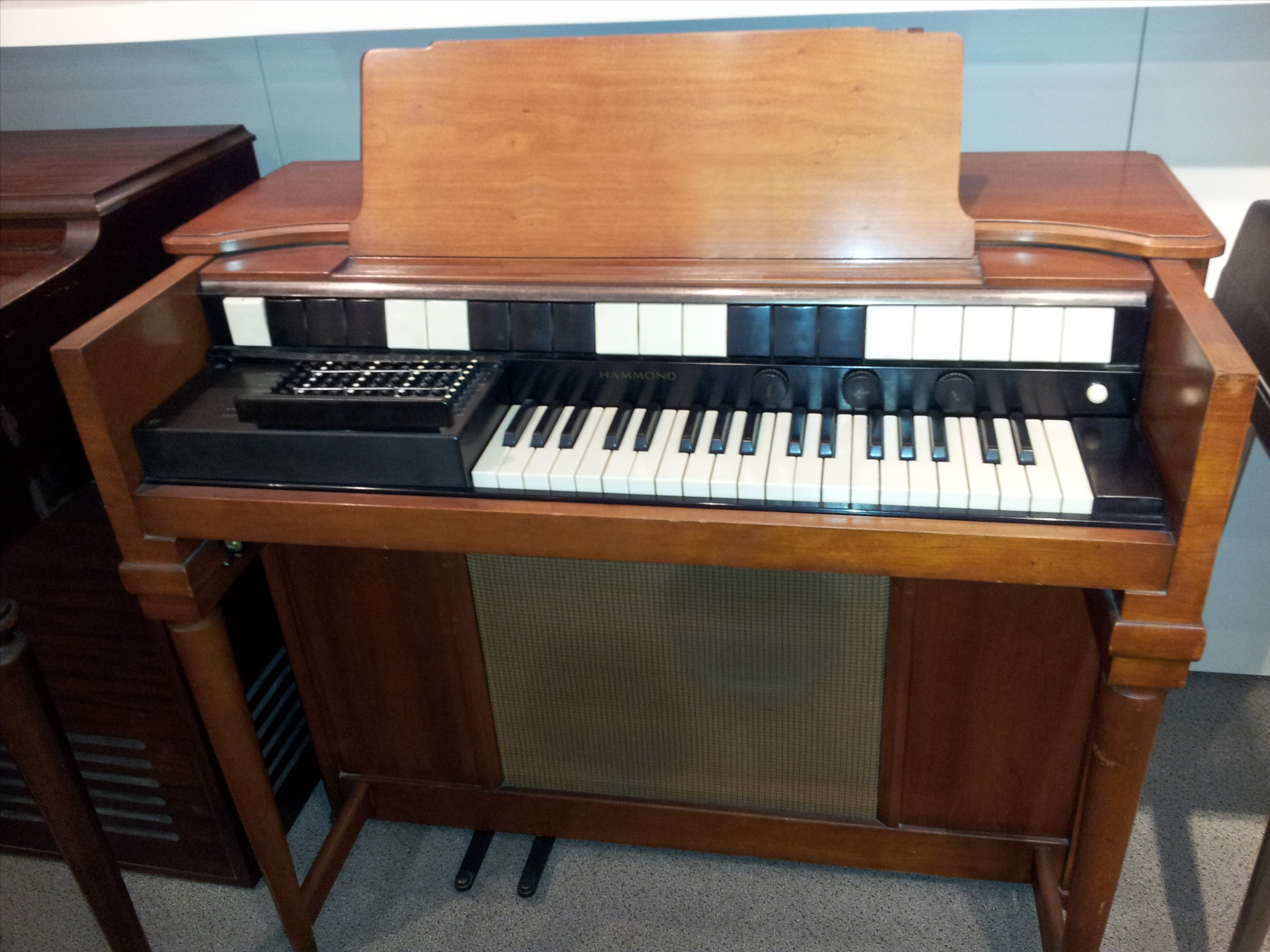
The first chord organ (1950 Hammond S-6). Array of buttons on left side are used to play chords.

Shortly after the debut of the spinet, the chord organ appeared. This is an even simpler instrument designed for those who wanted to produce an organ sound in the home without having to learn much organ (or even piano) playing technique. The typical chord organ has only a single manual that is usually an octave shorter than its already-abbreviated spinet counterpart. It also possesses scaled-down registration and no pedalboard. The left hand operates not a keyboard but an array of chord buttons adapted from those of an accordion.

The original Hammond Chord Organs in 1950 are electronic instruments using vacuum-tube technology. In 1958 Magnus Organ Corporation introduced chord organs similar to an electrically blown reed organ or harmonium.

=== Transistor organs (1957–) ===
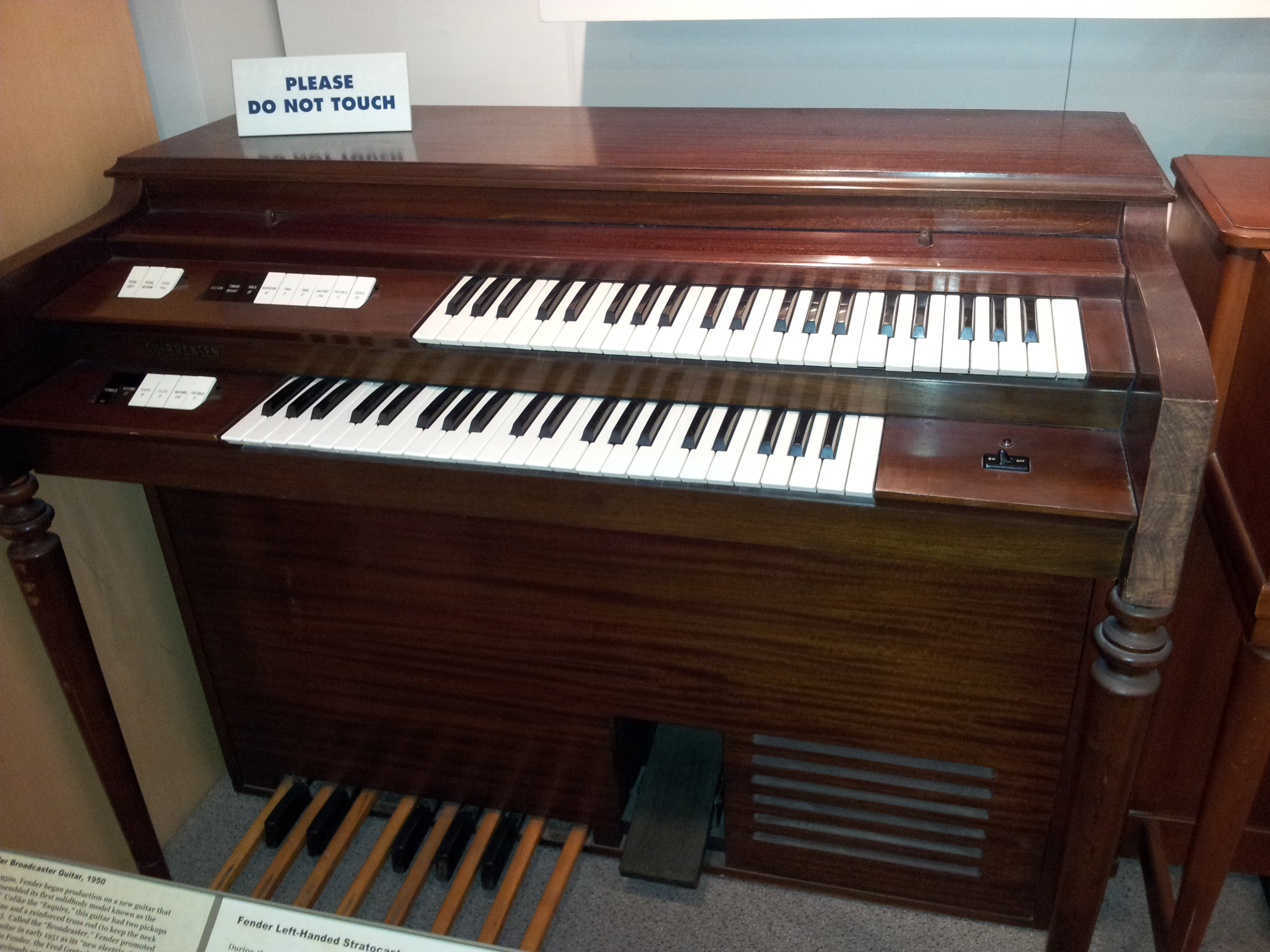
Early transistor organ (Gulbransen)

Electronic organs before the mid-1950s had used vacuum tubes which tended to be bulky and unstable. This restricted attempts to extend features and spread their use into homes. Transistors, invented at Bell Labs in 1947, went into practical production in the 1950s, and their small size and stability led to major changes in the production of electronics equipment, in what has been termed the "transistor revolution".

In 1957, a home organ manufacturer, Gulbransen, introduced the world's first transistor organ, Model B (Model 1100). Although it uses transistors for tone generation, vacuum tubes are still used for amplification. And in 1958, Rodgers built the first fully solid-state transistorized organ for church, called Opus 1 (Model 38). Other manufacturers followed.

=== Combo organs (1950s–) ===
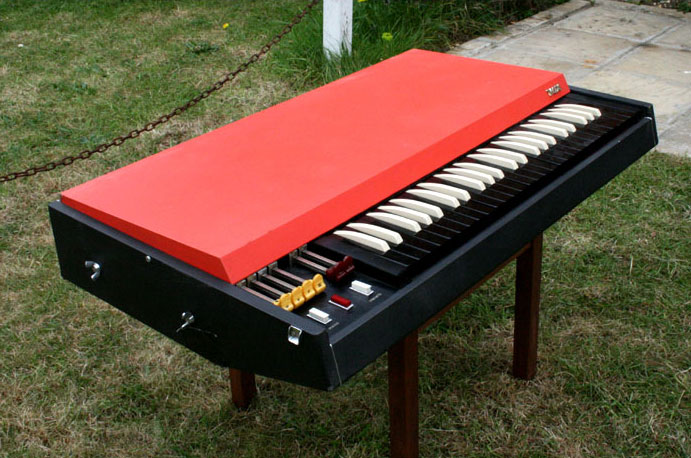
A combo organ (Vox Continental) using transistors. It's light, compact and portable.

By the 1960s, electronic organs were ubiquitous in all genres of popular music, from Lawrence Welk to acid rock (e.g. the Doors, Iron Butterfly) to the Bob Dylan album Blonde on Blonde. In some cases, Hammonds were used, while others featured very small all-electronic instruments, only slightly larger than a modern digital keyboard, called combo organs. (Various portable organs made by Farfisa and Vox were especially popular, and remain so among retro-minded rock combos.) The 1970s, 1980s and 1990s saw increasing specialization: both the gospel and jazz scenes continued to make heavy use of Hammonds, while various styles of rock began to take advantage of increasingly complex electronic keyboard instruments, as large-scale integration and then digital technology began to enter the mainstream.

=== Synthesizer organs (1970s–) ===
An Eminent 310 organ was prominently featured on Jean Michel Jarre's albums Oxygène (1977) and Equinoxe (1978). The Solina String Ensemble was used extensively by pop, rock, jazz, and disco artists, including Herbie Hancock, Elton John, Pink Floyd, Stevie Wonder, The Carpenters, George Clinton, Eumir Deodato, The Rolling Stones, The Buggles, Rick James, George Harrison, and The Bee Gees.

Various synthesizer organs

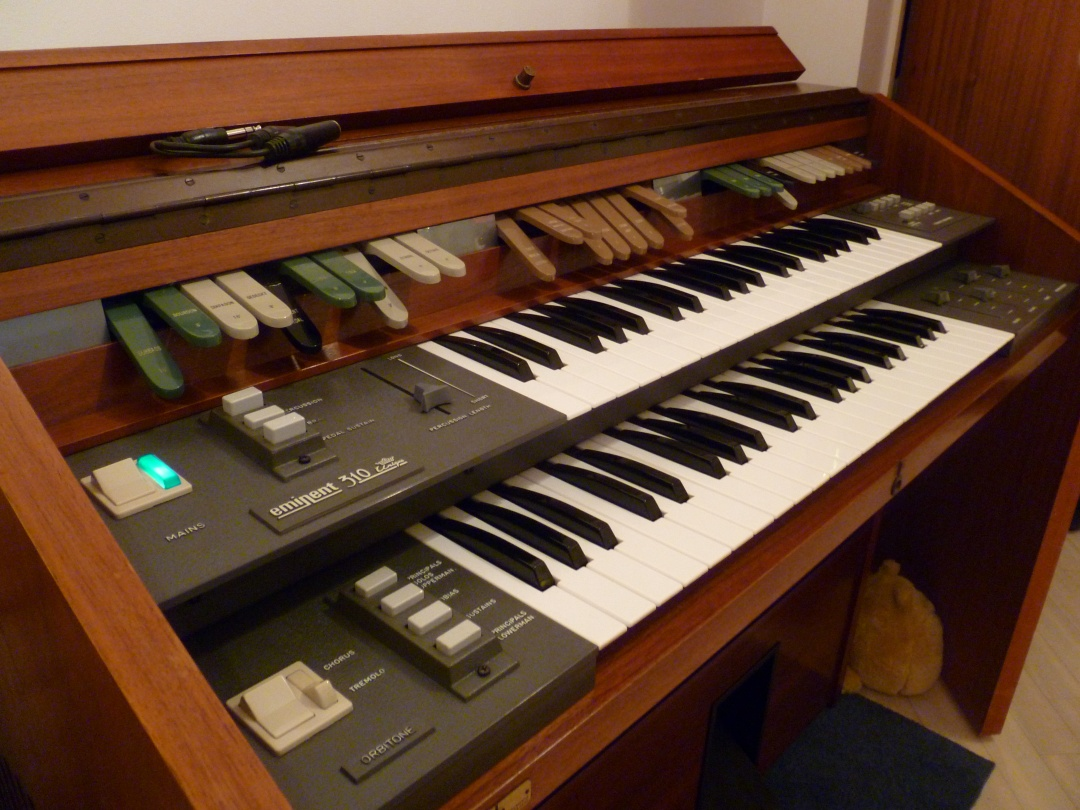
Eminent 310U (1972) with String Ensemble section

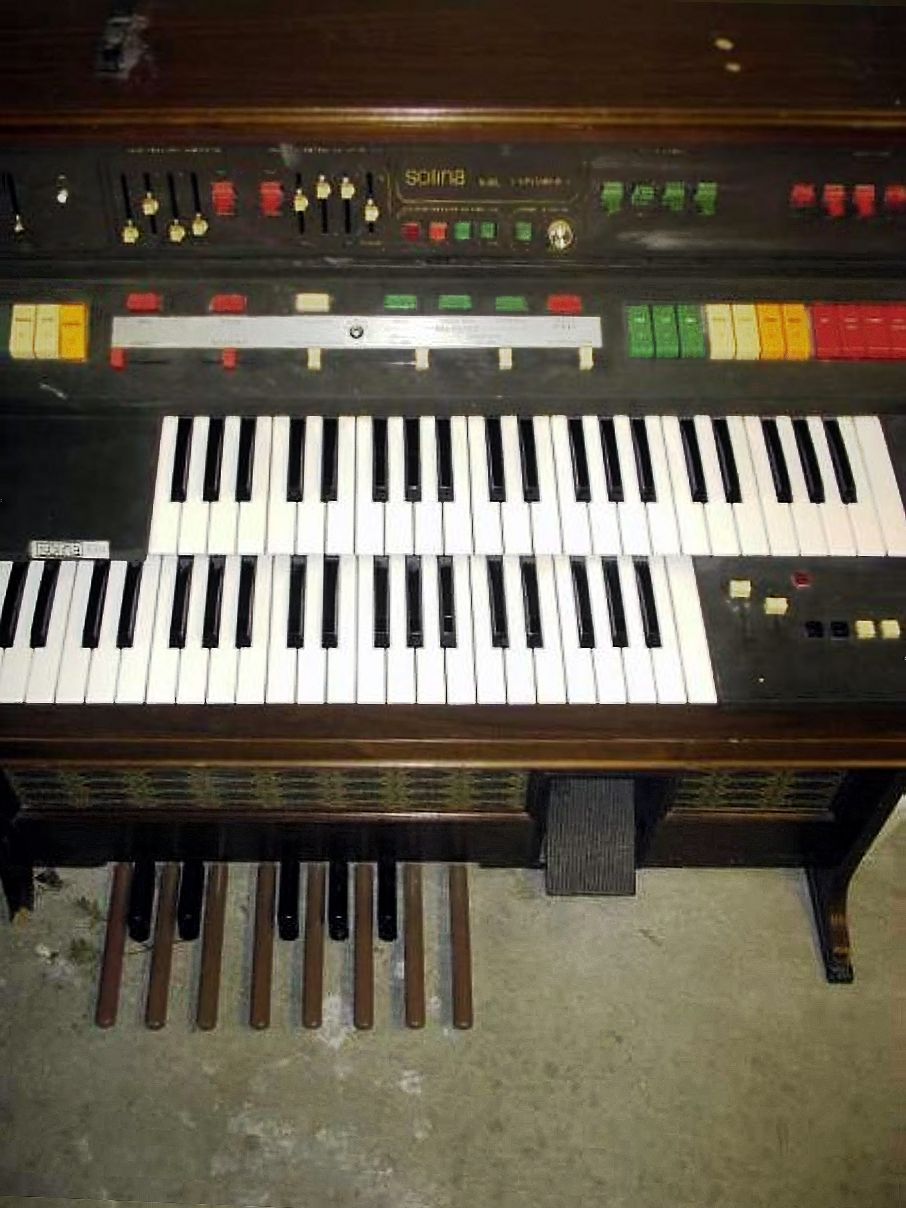
Eminent Solina C112s (c. 1974) with built-in ARP Explorer I synthesizer

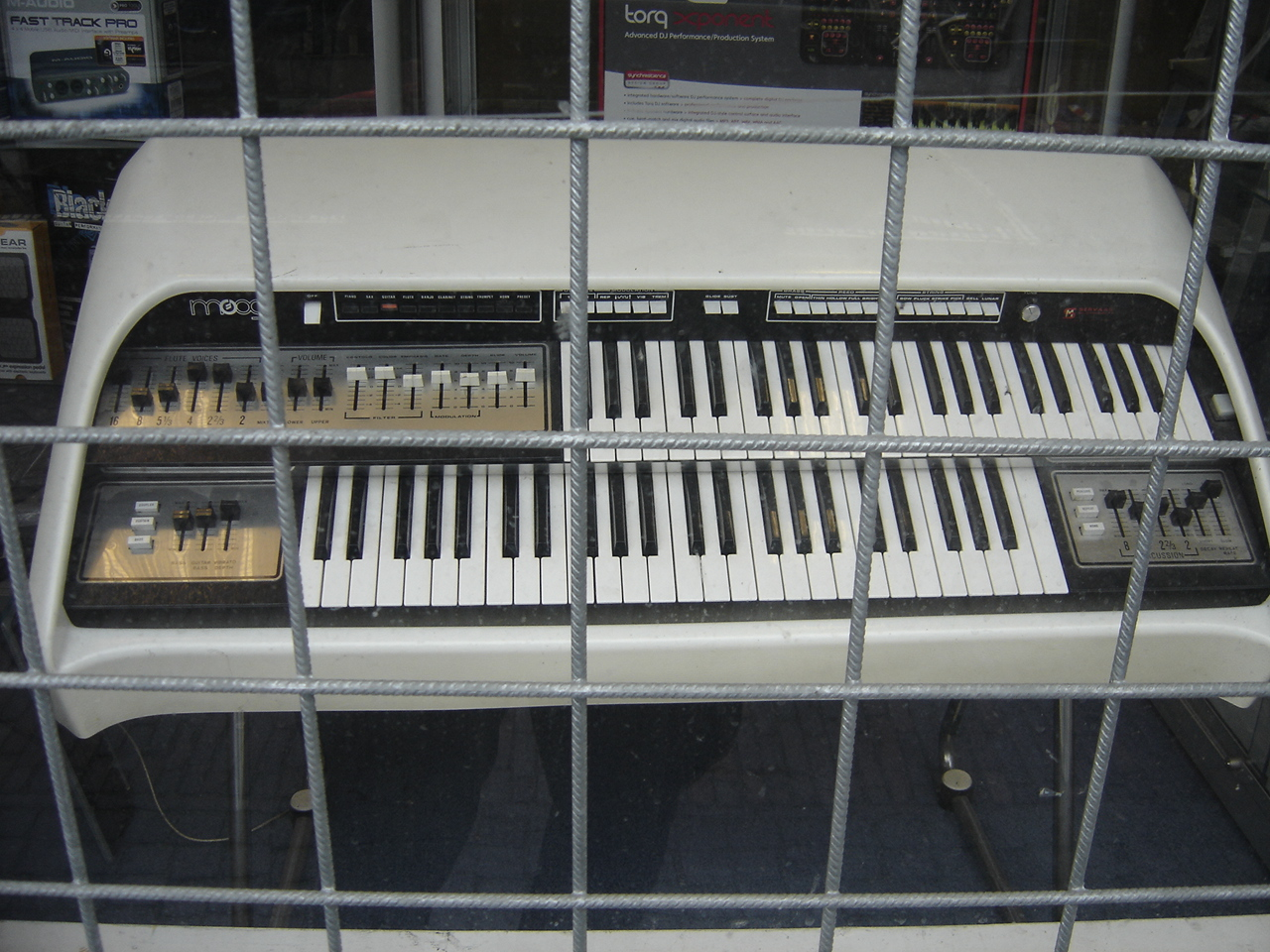
CMI Cordovox CDX-0652 (c.1974) with built-in Moog Satellite synthesizer

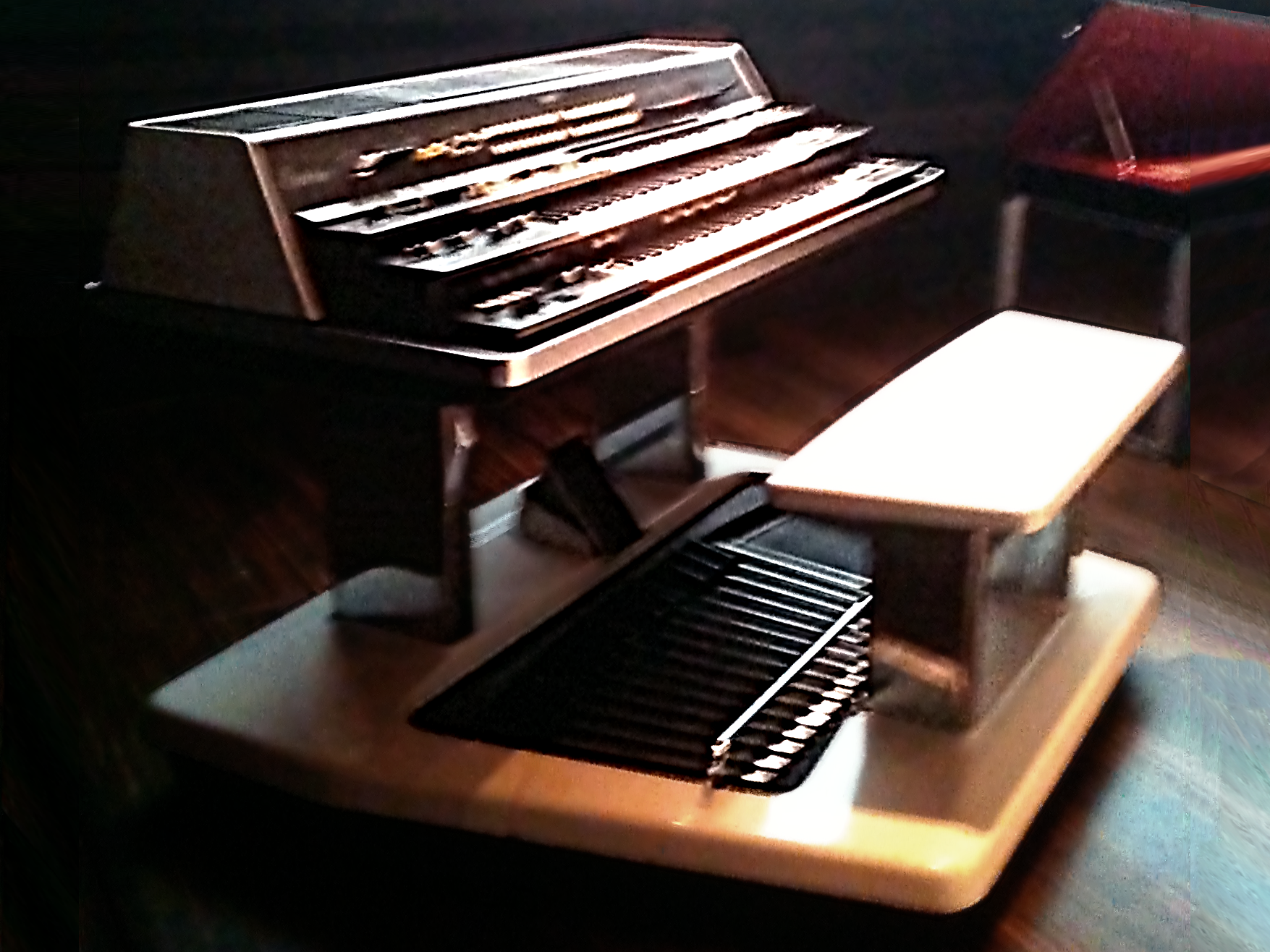
Yamaha GX-1 (c.1975), an earliest polyphonic synthesizer.

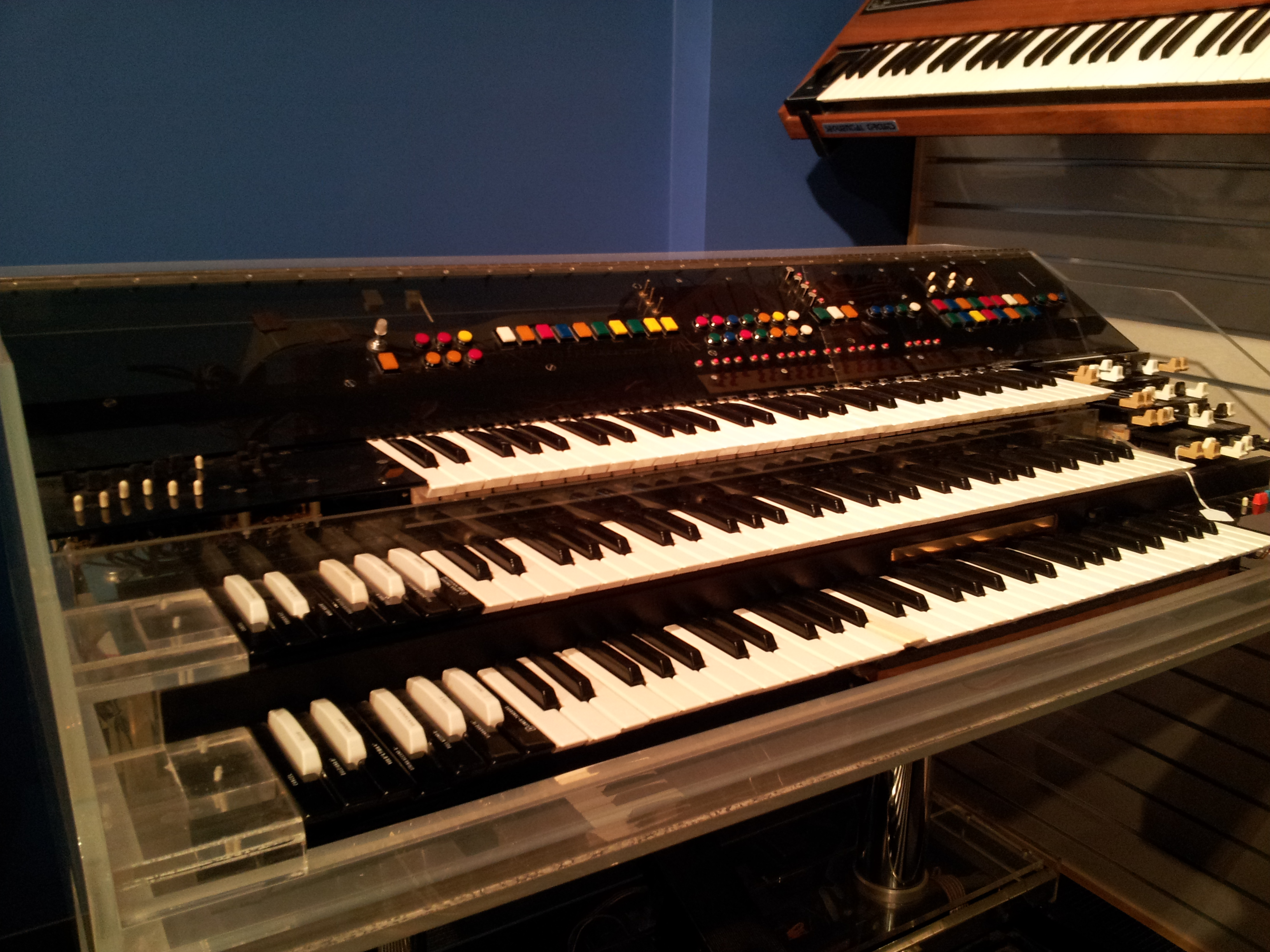
Don Lewis' LEO: (Live Electronic Orchestra) (1977) using an earliest polyphonic keyboard by Armand Pascetta.

Typical features on Synthesizer organs

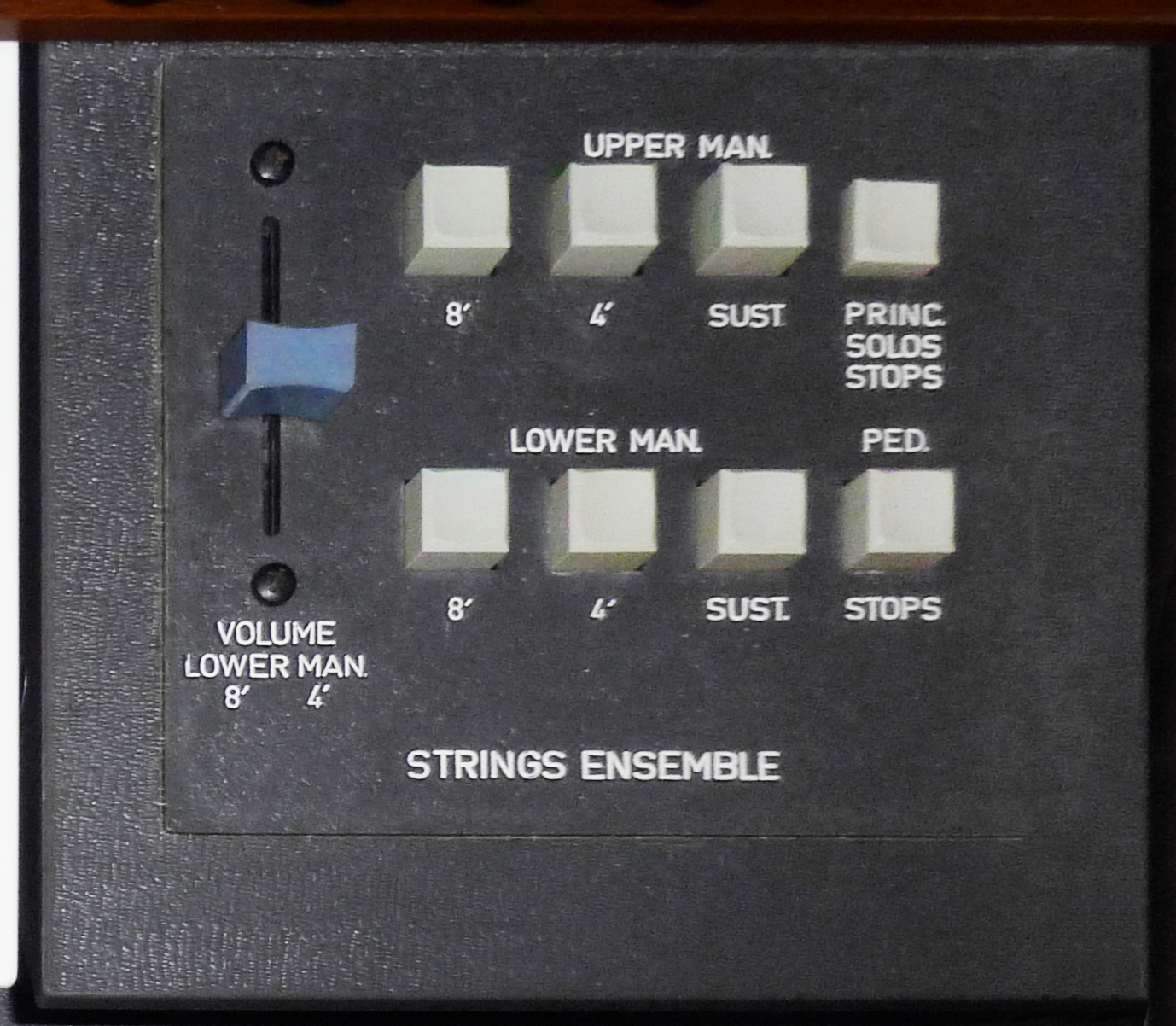
built-in String Ensemble section on Eminent 310U

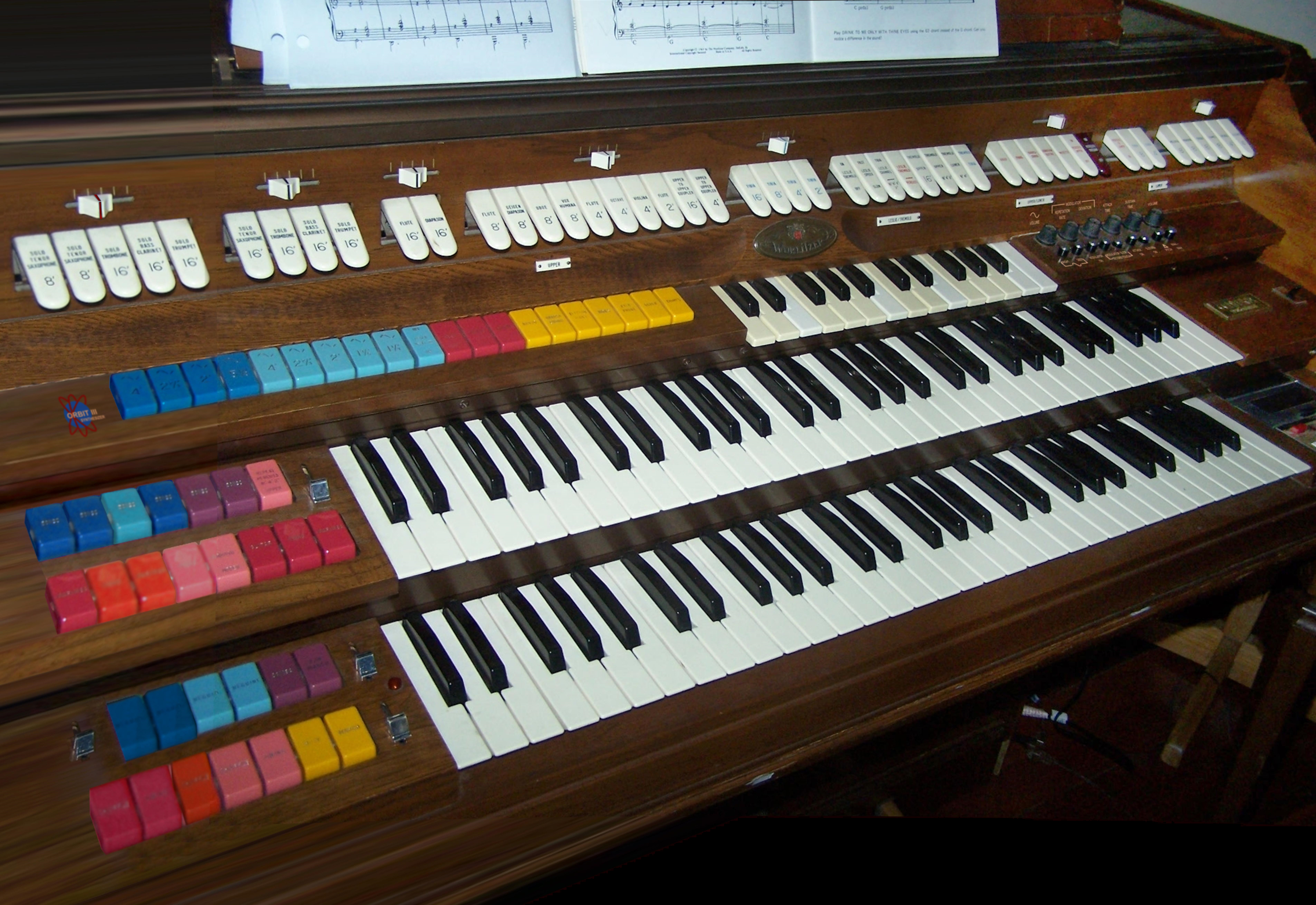
built-in Monophonic Synthesizer Orbit III (entire second row with mini-keys) on Wurlitzer 805 (1974)

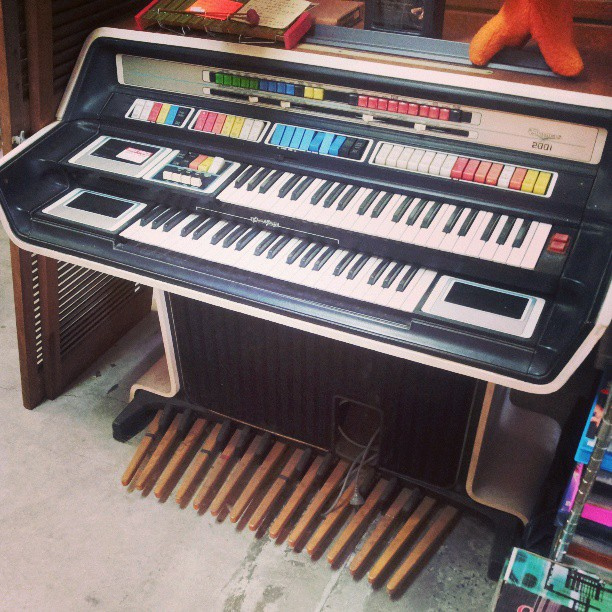
Thomas 2001 (1976)

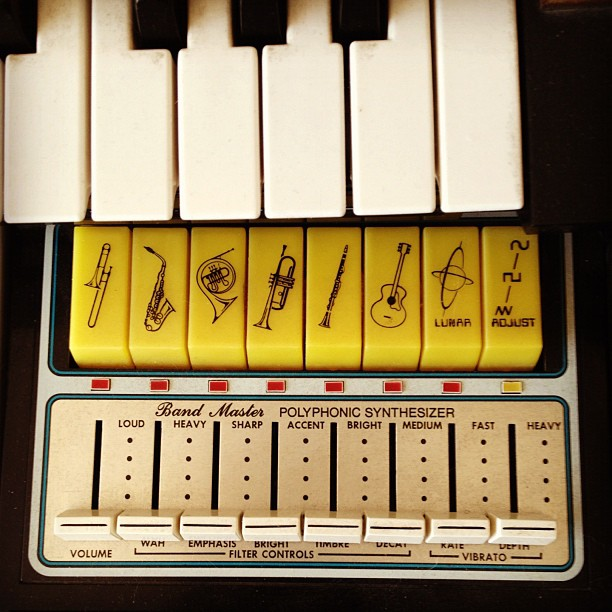
optional Polyphonic Synthesizer Band Master on Thomas 2001

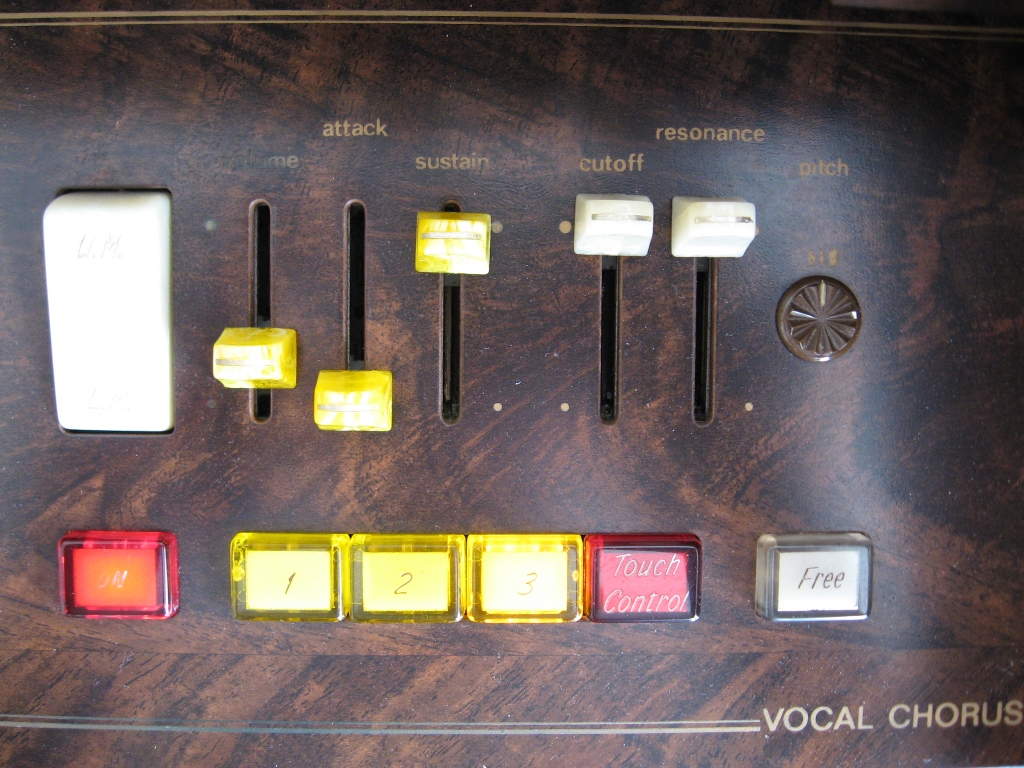
built-in Vocal Chorus Synthesizer on Farfisa Pergamon (1981)

=== Digital organs (1971–) ===
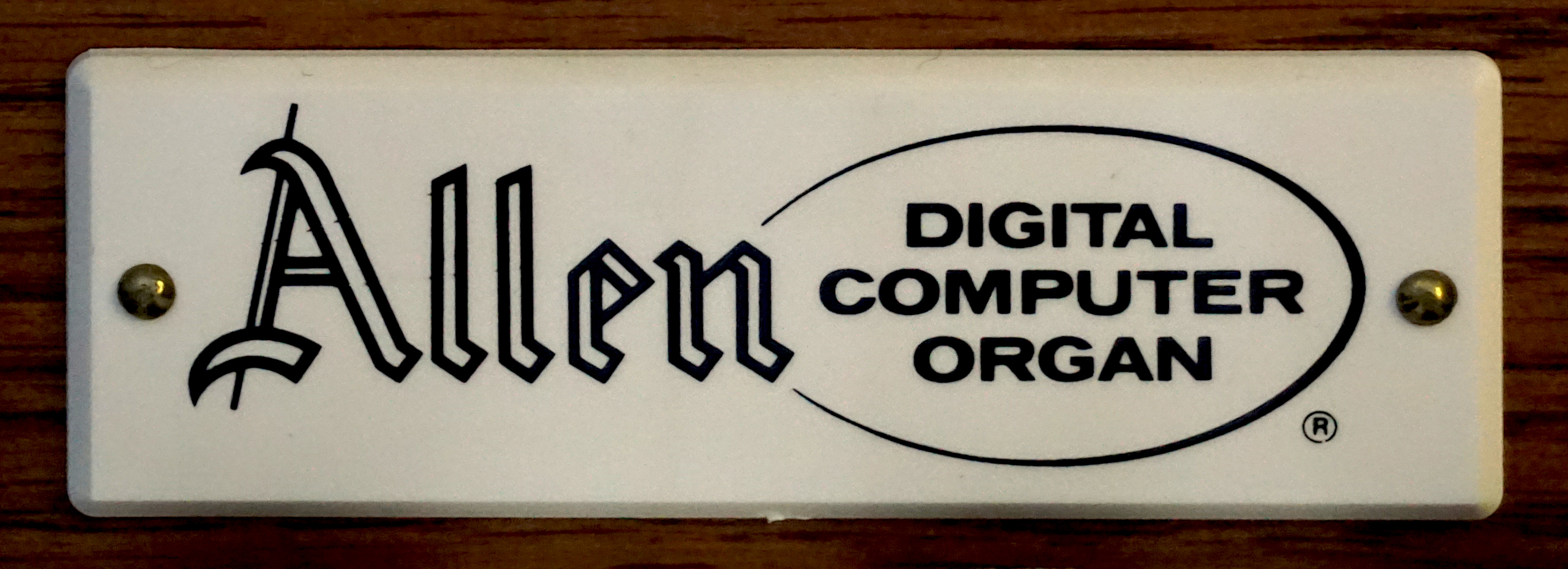
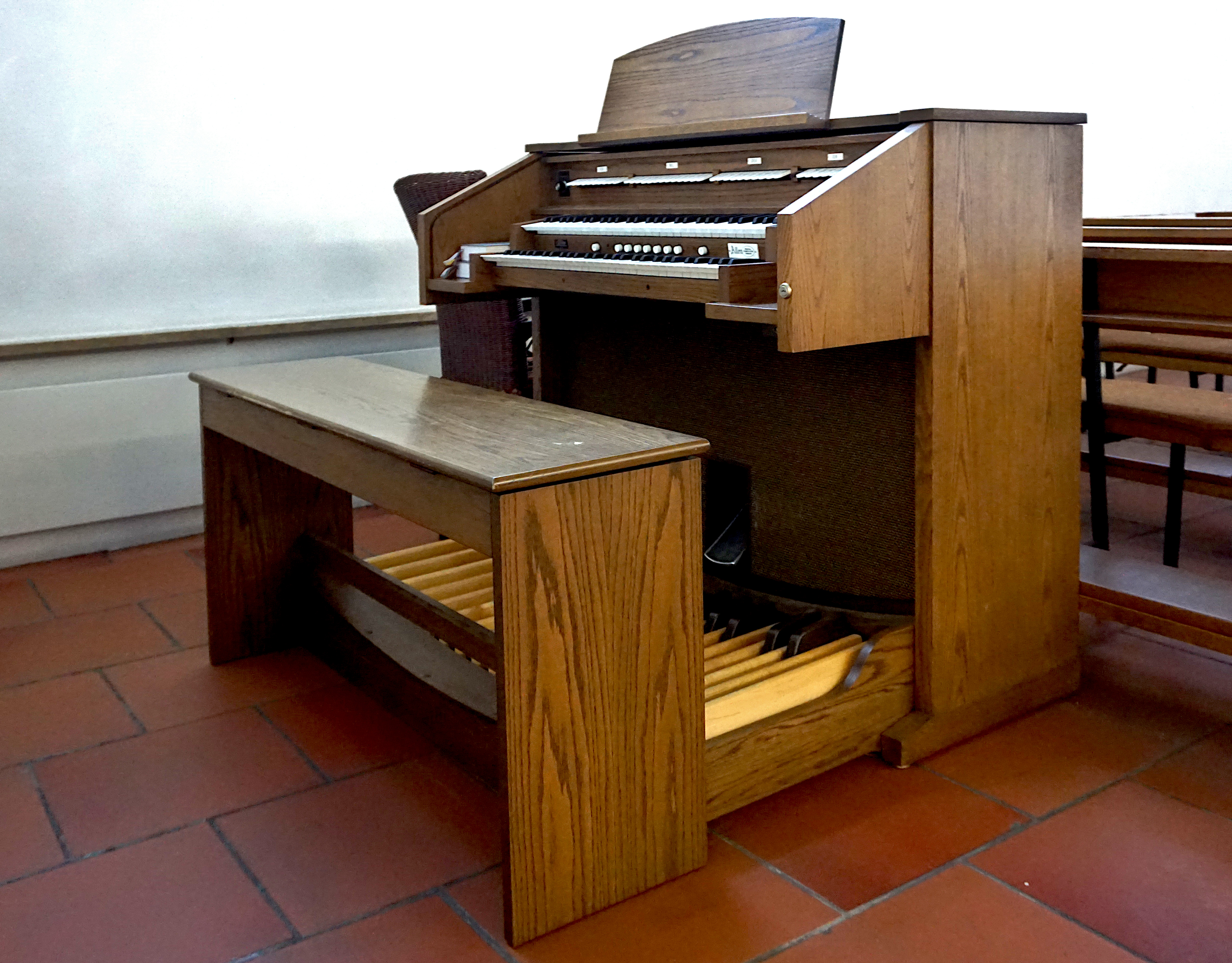
Allen Digital Computer Organ

Allen introduced the world's first digital organ (and first digital musical instrument commercial product) in 1971: the Allen Digital Computer Organ. This new technology was developed for use in home organs by North American Rockwell (project leader Ralph Deutsch) and licensed to Allen, which began using it for church organs. Allen later sued Rockwell and Deutsch, and gained sole rights to the digital computer organ technology.

In 1980, Rodgers introduced the first church organs controlled by microprocessors, partially based on research at the University of Bradford. The university's "Bradford Computing Organ" has technological descendants in some European digital organs using synthesis technology today.

This style of instrument has also been popular with some classically trained concert organists preferring to avoid learning an unfamiliar pipe organ for every concert location, and wishing to perform in venues without pipe organs. Virgil Fox utilized a large Rodgers organ dubbed "Black Beauty" during his Heavy Organ tour during the early 1970s. From 1977 until his death in 1980, he used a custom Allen electronic organ. Carlo Curley toured with a substantial Allen Organ in the US and with an Allen in the UK. Organist Hector Olivera has toured with a custom Rodgers instrument named "The King," and Cameron Carpenter has recently begun touring with a custom 5-manual digital organ by Marshall & Ogletree.

=== Modern digital organs (1980s–) ===
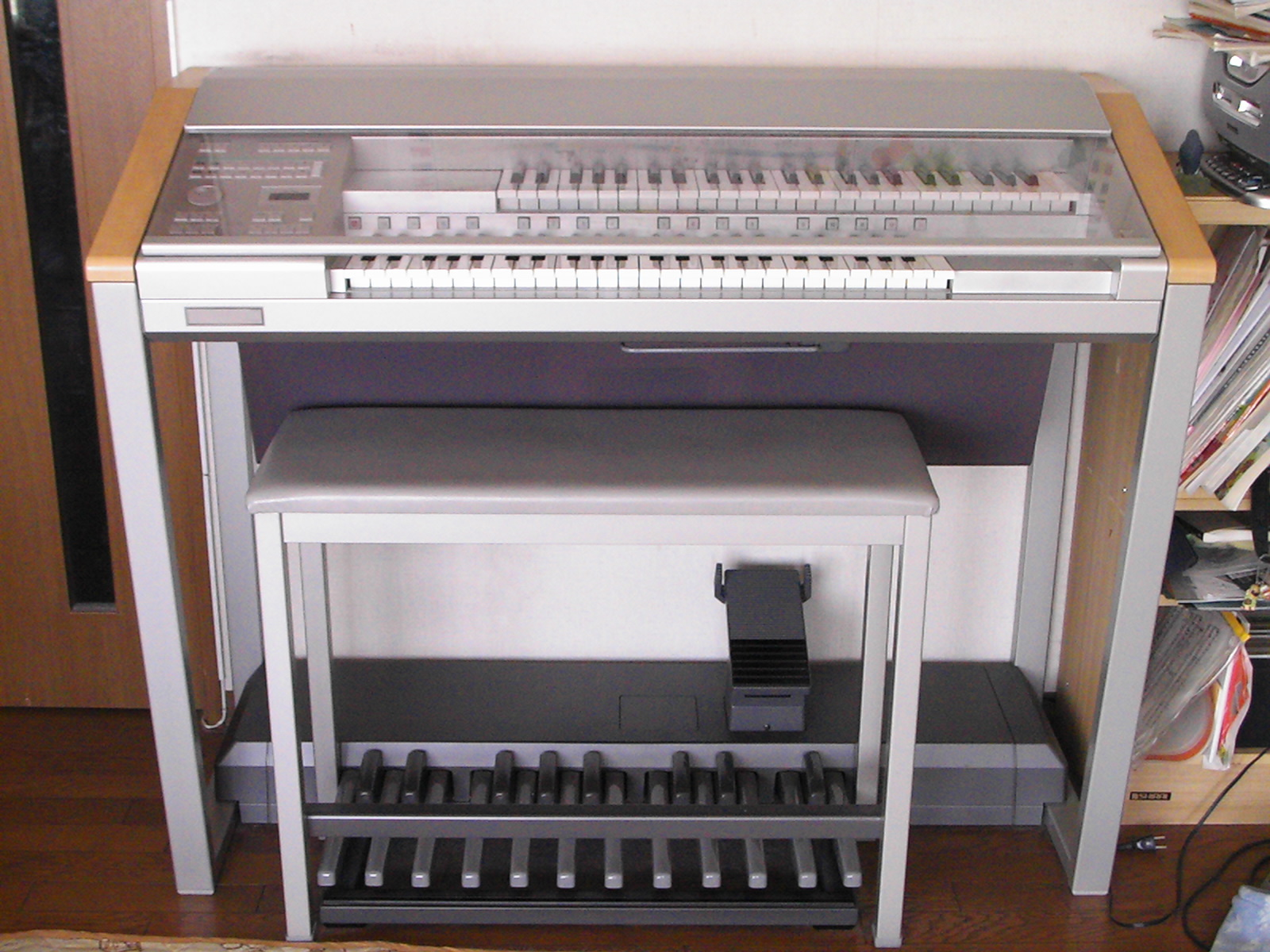
A modern electronic organ (Yamaha Electone STAGEA ELS-01). Though it resembles a 1950s spinet organ in appearance, its digital tone generators and synthesis modules can imitate hundreds of instruments.

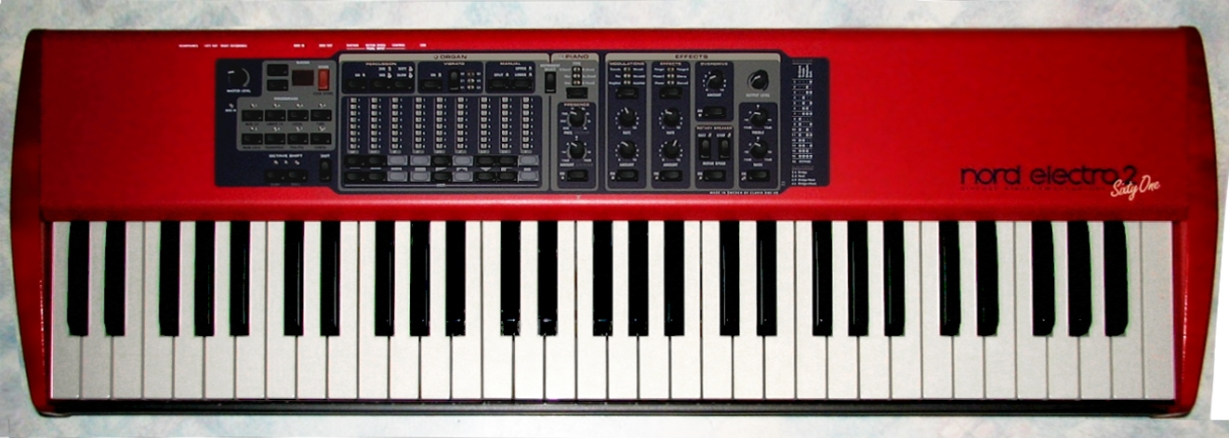
A modern digital combo organ using DSP technology (Nord Electro 2).

Electronic organs are still made for the home market, but they have been largely replaced by the digital keyboard or synthesizer which is smaller and cheaper than typical electronic organs or traditional pianos. Modern digital organs offer features not found in traditional pipe organs, such as orchestral and percussion sounds, a choice of historical pitch standards and temperaments, and advanced console aids.

Digital organs incorporate real-time tone generation based on sampling or synthesis technologies, and may include MIDI, and Internet connectivity for downloading music data and instructional materials to USB flash drive or media card storage. While much more complex than their predecessors, their basic appearance makes them instantly recognizable.

The best digital organs of the 2000s incorporate these technical features:

DSP technology

In 1990, Rodgers introduced software-based digital church organs with technology which connected multiple Digital Signal Processors (DSP) in parallel to generate pipe organ sound with stereo imaging. Sounds in other digital organs are derived from DSPs in either a sampled or synthesis type generation system. Sampled technologies use sounds recorded from various ranks of pipe organs. In synthesis systems, the wave shape is created by tone generators instead of using a sound sample. Both systems generate organ tones, sometimes in stereo in better systems, rather than simply playing recorded tones as a simple digital keyboard sampler might do. Marketed by Eminent, Wyvern, Copeman Hart, Cantor, and Van der Pole in Europe, synthesis organs may use circuitry purchased from Musicom, an English supply company. In the digital organ category, synthesis-based systems are rarely seen outside of Europe.

Sampling

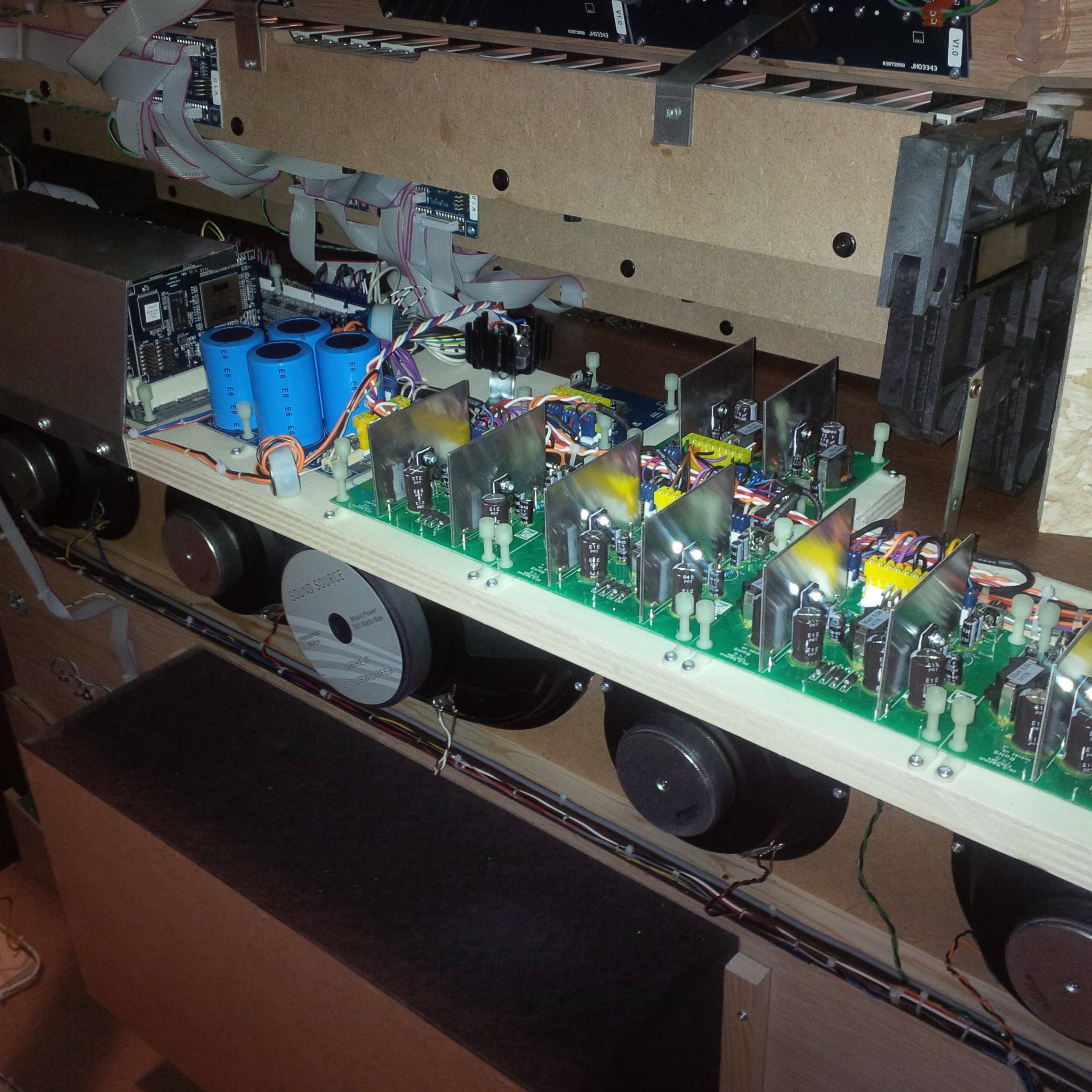
Digital sampling circuitry of the Johannus model 370 organ (built in 2015), producing the equivalent of 73 ranks with 4 temperaments.

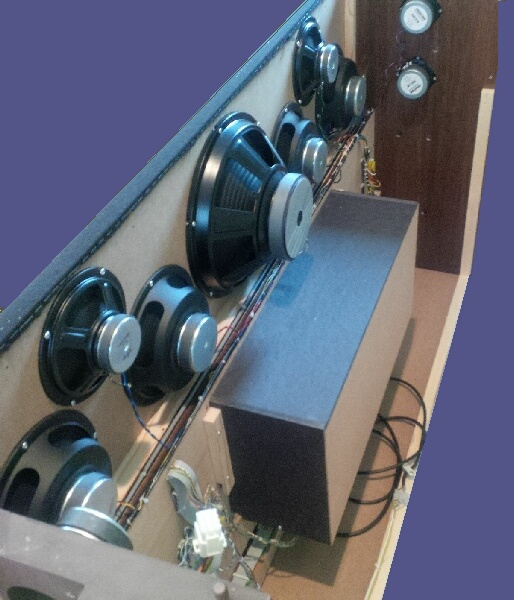
Typical speaker array in a modern digital organ with high-power subwoofers.

Many digital organs use high-quality samples to produce an accurate sound. Sampled systems may have samples of organ pipe sound for each individual note, or may use only one or a few samples which are then frequency-shifted to generate the equivalent of a 61-note pipe rank. Some digital organs like Walker Technical and the very costly Marshall & Ogletree organs use longer samples for additional realism, rather than having to repeat shorter samples in their generation of sound. Sampling in 2000s-era organs is typically done with 24-bit or 32-bit resolution, at a higher rate than the 44.1 kHz of CD-quality audio having 16-bit resolution.

Surround sound

On most digital organs, several audio channels are used to create a more spacious sound. Higher-quality digital organ builders use custom audio and speaker systems and may provide from 8 to 32 or more independent channels of audio, depending on the size of the organ and the budget for the instrument. With dedicated high-power subwoofers for the lowest frequencies, digital organs can approach the physical sensation of a pipe organ.

Pipe organ simulations

To better simulate pipe organs, some digital organs emulate changes of windchest pressure caused by the air pressure dropping slightly when many notes are sounding simultaneously, which changes the sound of all the pipes.

Digital organs may also incorporate simulated models of swell boxes which mimic the environmental effects on pipes, pipe chest valve release, and other pipe organ characteristics. These effects can be included in the sound of modern digital organs to create more realistic pipe organ tone.

Digital pipe sound can include sampled or modeled room acoustics. Rodgers uses binaural and crosstalk cancellation processing to create real-time acoustic models, and Allen also uses room acoustics as part of the sound generation.

=== Software organs (1990s–) ===
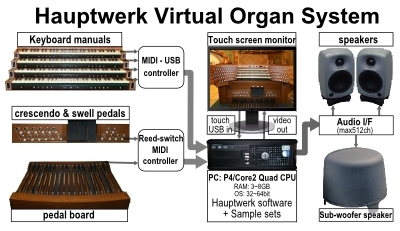

A software organ system (Hauptwerk virtual organ)

The data processing power of PCs has made personal organs more affordable. Software applications can store digital pipe sound samples and combine them in real time in response to input from one or more MIDI controllers. These tools can be used to assemble home-built organs that can rival the sound quality of commercially built digital organs at a relatively low cost.

== In churches ==
=== Pipe-electronic hybrid organs (1930s–) ===
Early combinations of pipe organs and electronic technology (including the electronic tone generators, at later) were developed in the 1930s. Custom electronic organ consoles occasionally replace aging pipe consoles, updating the electrical control system for the pipes as well as adding electronic voices to the organ. Even large pipe organs are often supplemented with electronic voices for the deepest bass tones that would otherwise require 16- to 32-foot pipes.

For hybrid organs that combine pipes and electronic sounds, pipes change their pitch with environmental changes, but electronic voices do not follow by default. The frequency of sound produced by an organ pipe depends on its geometry and the speed of sound in the air within it. These change slightly with temperature and humidity, so the pitch of an organ pipe will change slightly as the environment changes. The pitch of the electronic portion of a hybrid instrument must be re-tuned as needed. The simplest method is a manual control that the organist can adjust, but some recent digital models can make such adjustments automatically.

=== Electronic church organs (1939–) ===
The first full electronic church organ was built in 1939 by Jerome Markowitz, founder of the Allen Organ Company, who had worked for years to perfect the replication of pipe organ sound through the use of oscillator circuitry based on radio tubes. In 1958, Rodgers Organ Company built the first solid-state, transistorized church organ, its three-manual Opus 1.

In contrast to frequency divider circuitry with only a few independent pitch sources, quality electronic church organs have at least one oscillator per note and often additional sets to create a superior ensemble effect. For instance, Rodgers Opus 1 featured eight sets of transistorized pitch generators. Even today, digital organs use software-based digital oscillators to create large numbers of independent pitch and tone sources to better simulate the effect of a large pipe organ.

=== Digital church organs (1971–) ===
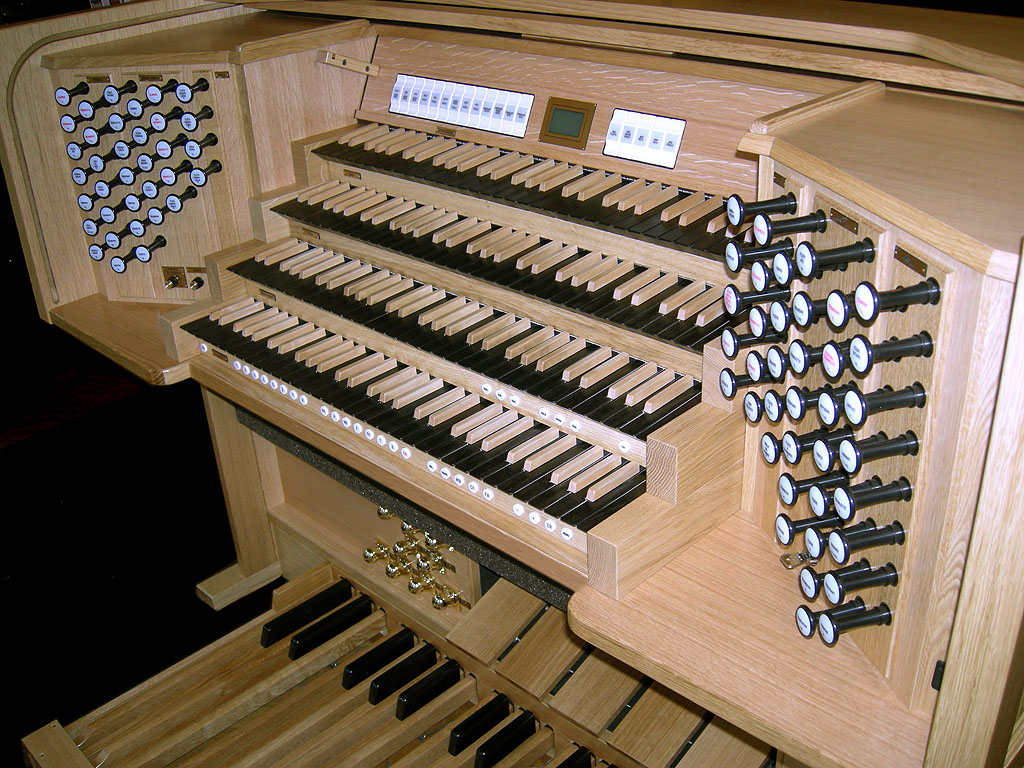
2006 Johannus 'Rembrandt,' an example of a large digital organ

Digital church organs are designed as pipe organ replacements or as digital consoles to play existing pipes. The differences in sound timbre between piped and digital instruments are debated, but modern digital organs are less expensive and more space efficient.

Digital organs are a viable alternative for churches that may have a pipe organ and can no longer afford to maintain it. Some pipe organs, on the other hand, might be playable without major rebuilding for many decades. However the high initial cost, and longer lead time to design, build, and "voice" pipe organs has limited their production.

Most new digital church organs synthesize sounds from recorded pipe samples, although some model the pipe sound by additive synthesis. Modelling the sound is done by a professional organ "voicer", who finishes the organ in its location, much like the process of regulating and voicing a pipe organ. These organs also use high-quality custom-designed audio systems. The builders of both custom and factory digital church organs include the firms of Ahlborn-Galanti, Allen, Eminent, Johannus, Makin, Rodgers, Viscount, and Wyvern.

== See also ==
- Digital piano
- List of electronic organ makers
- MIDI
- Organ (music)
