= List of electronic organ makers =

This is a list of electronic organ makers.

== Brazil ==
- Bonh (Sistemas Johannus - Novo Hamburgo - RS)
- Tokai (Antiga Minami, é também a maior fabricante de órgãos da américa latina e do mundo)
- Harmonia (setembro de 2012)
- Digital Acordes
- Gambitt (Uma das marcas mais clássicas do Brasil)
- Saema
- Phinker
- DualKey
- Tocamais
- Schieffer
- Grace
- Koller
- Rohnes
- Yahalom

== Canada ==
- Artisan Classic Organ Inc. (dba Classic Organ Works) – Markham, Ontario
- The Classic Organ Company Ltd. – Markham, Ontario
- Hallman Organ Co. – Kitchener, Ontario
- Minshall Organ Company – London, Ontario
- Phoenix Organs – Peterborough, Ontario
- The Robb Wave Organ Company – Belleville, Ontario
- Northern Electric (manufacturer of Hammond organs) – Belleville, Ontario and Montreal, Quebec

== China ==
- Hsin-Hai Teodorico PC Organ (in cooperation with Hauptwerk) – Beijing
- Ringway – Changzhou, Jiangsu

== Denmark ==
- Skandinavisk Orgelcentrum ApS, Vejle. Hybracoustric church organs - Home organs - Hauptwerk Nordic
  http://www.churchorgans.com
  http://www.kirchenorgeln.eu
  https://www.kirkeorgel.dk
  https://www.blanth.com

== Finland ==
- Walton
- WLM-Organ

== Germany ==
- Ahlborn Orgel – Heimerdingen
- Dr. Böhm
- Hoffrichter Orgel – Salzwedel
- Wersi
- Hohner

== Italy ==
- Armon (company) – Porto Recanati (1970s)
- Bontempi - Potenza Picena
- Crumar
- Farfisa – Osimo
- Generalmusic (GEM)
- Orla - Castelfidardo
- Viscount International – Mondaino
- Eko
- Jen
- Elgam
- Elka
- Siel
- Ketron
- Logan
- CRB

== Japan ==
- Kawai Musical Instruments
- Korg
- Roland Corporation
- Technics (brand)
- Yamaha Corporation
- JVC Victron
- Hammond Suzuki
- ACE tone
- Casio

== The Netherlands ==
- Content Organs Holland
- Eminent Organs – Bodegraven (closed), Lelystad (since 1994)
- Johannus – Ede
- Bemore instruments
- RiHa
- Philips

== South Korea ==
- Kurzweil Music Systems

== Sweden ==
- Clavia Digital Musical Instruments

== United Kingdom ==
- Bird
- JMI Jennings Musical Industries - VOX
- John Compton Organ Company of Acton – Nottingham and London (now Makin Organs)
- Copeman Hart Organs — Shaw (now part of ChurchOrganWorld)
- Eminent UK — Designer of British organs and exclusive distributor of the Eminent brand. Based in Wincanton.
- Kentucky (a small company based out of Poole, Dorset headed by Ken Tuck. They made three organs in the range, the Challenger, Explorer and Adventurer)
- Maestrovox
- Makin Organs — Shaw (now part of ChurchOrganWorld)
- Wyvern Organs – Kirdford

== United States ==
- Ahlborn-Galanti – Bensenville, Illinois (division of family company, Generalmusic)
- Allen Organ Company – Macungie, Pennsylvania
- Baldwin Piano Company – Nashville, Tennessee
- C.G. Conn – Chicago, Illinois (closed)
- Gulbransen
- Hammond Organ Company – Chicago, Illinois
- Lowrey Organ Company – Chicago, Illinois
- Marshall & Ogletree – Needham, Massachusetts
- Rodgers Instruments – Hillsboro, Oregon (owned by parent company Vandeweerd in Netherland, owner of Johannus)
- Thomas Organ Company
- Walker Technical Company - Center Valley, Pennsylvania
