= Central Music =

Piano and organ dealer located in Clearwater, Florida

- Industry: Piano and organ dealer
- Founded: 1958; 68 years ago in St. Petersburg, Florida, United States
- Founder: Les Trubey
- Headquarters: Clearwater, Florida, United States
- Areas served: Florida, Georgia, parts of the Caribbean

Central Music, Inc., founded in 1958 is a piano and organ dealer located in Clearwater, Florida. Central Music represents Rodgers Instruments, Fratelli Ruffatti, Blüthner, Hammond organ and Roland Corporation instruments. They serve Florida, Georgia and the Caribbean.

== History ==
Central Music is a Florida corporation that began in 1958. It was founded by Les Trubey and its first location was opened on Central Avenue in St. Petersburg, Florida (explaining the name). The late 1950s through the early 1980s represent the peak of the home organ industry in the United States. In its beginning, Central Music represented the Wurlitzer brand of home organs and pianos for the Tampa Bay area of Florida. Shortly after its founding, Central Music also became the dealer for Rodgers Instruments to serve the musical needs of the area's churches. One of the most popular organs found in churches and homes alike is the Rodgers organ.

Central Music enjoyed great success with Wurlitzer. Due to this early success, Central Music was faced with a need for a larger location. It was also at this time that Les Trubey and Nelson Newby of Illinois became acquainted. In 1973, Trubey built a new home for Central Music—a 15,000-square-foot (1,400 m^{2}) building at 5175 Ulmerton Road, Clearwater, Florida 33760 (where Central Music still resides today). At the time, there were cow pastures on either side of the building. However, the area has grown up around Central Music with an international airport within 2 miles (3.2 km) and a new eight lane road in front of the building.

In 1977, due to health issues, Les Trubey decided to retire. Having developed a friendship over the years due to their mutual experience with Wurlitzer, Trubey approached Nelson Newby and offered him the company. In November 1977, Nelson Newby with his wife Sharon and son Timothy moved to Florida and became Central Music's new owners.

At that time, Central Music had three locations throughout the Tampa Bay area. These locations not only offered new and used instruments for sale but were also locations where private lessons and group lessons were available. Around 1980, due to challenges from competition, a worsening economy and what was the beginning of a decline to the home organ industry, Wurlitzer began to struggle. To compensate, Central Music took on a new brand in the musical instrument field, Yamaha. Yamaha, quickly rose to prominence in both the piano and (albeit declining) home organ industries.

In recognition for Central Music's sales and service, company president Nelson Newby was nominated to the National Association of Music Merchants (NAMM) Board of Directors in 1984. The highlight of his tenure was as co-chairman of the committee that created NAMM University and as a workshop presenter in its inaugural season.

Over the years, Central Music's church organ division steadily became a larger and larger portion of the company's revenues. In the mid-1980s, Central Music began to shift its attention away from home products, and moved toward the churches outside Tampa Bay.

Today Central Music serves Florida, Georgia and the Caribbean.

== Brands represented ==
Liturgical worship styles: Rodgers Instruments, LLC. of Hillsboro, Oregon Fratelli Ruffatti, pipe organ builders of Padua, Italy

Contemporary and Gospel worship styles: Rodgers Instruments, LLC. of Hillsboro, Oregon Roland Corporation (U.S.) Hammond organ and Leslie speaker

Concert pianos: Blüthner Piano Company – Leipzig, Germany Kawai Brand Pianos

== Notable organ installations ==
- First Presbyterian Church, Naples, Florida website, Fratelli Ruffatti organ V-manuals 108-ranks + 12 digital stops (Rodgers)
- Epiphany Catholic Church, Miami FL Official Website, Fratelli Ruffatti organ with twin III-manual consoles, 61-ranks
- John's Creek Baptist Church, Alpharetta GA Official Website, Fratelli Ruffatti organ V-manuals 103-ranks + digital stops
- St. Mary Cathedral (Catholic), Miami FL Official Website, Rodgers Custom IV-manual pipe organ console + 90 digital stops
- Exciting Idlewild Baptist Church, Lutz FL Official Website, Rodgers Custom IV-manual organ
- The Cathedral of St. Jude the Apostle (Catholic), St. Petersburg FL Official Website, Rodgers Custom IV-manual organ + 10-ranks of Fratelli Ruffatti pipes & Rodgers III-manual organ
- The Cathedral of St. Ignatius Loyola, (Catholic) Palm Beach FL Official Website, Rodgers Custom IV-manual organ
- St Peter's Cathedral (Episcopal) St. Petersburg FL Official Website, Rodgers Custom IV-manual pipe organ console + digital stops
- First United Methodist Church, Clearwater FL Official Website, Rodgers Custom IV-manual pipe organ console + digital stops
- Covenant Presbyterian Church, Ft. Myers FL, Rodgers Custom IV-manual organ
- First Presbyterian Church, Boca Raton FL Official Website, Rodgers III-manual organ + 23-ranks of Fratelli Ruffatti pipes
- First Baptist Church, St. Petersburg FL Official Website, Rodgers Custom IV-manual organ + 4-ranks of Fratelli Ruffatti pipes
- First United Methodist Church, Tavares FL Official Website, Rodgers III-manual organ + 4-ranks
- Suntree United Methodist Church, Melbourne FL Official Website, Rodgers III-manual organ
- Anona United Methodist Church, Largo FL Official Website, Rodgers III-manual organ + 4-ranks of Ruffatti pipes
- St. Catherine Catholic Church, Clearwater FL (2010) Official Website, Rodgers Custom III-manual organ + 4-ranks of Fratelli Ruffatti pipes
- St. Stephen Lutheran Church, Longwood FL Official Website, Rodgers III-manual organ + 4-ranks of Fratelli Ruffatti pipes
- St. Paul's Lutheran Church Lakeland, Florida Official Website, Rodgers III-manual organ + 12-ranks of Fratelli Ruffatti pipes
- St. Lawrence Catholic Church, Tampa FL Official Website, Rodgers III-manual organ + 12-ranks of pipes
- St. Frances Xavier Cathedral (Catholic), Nassau Bahamas Official Website, Rodgers III-manual organ + 6-ranks of Fratelli Ruffatti pipes
- Saints Peter and Paul Cathedral (Catholic), St. Thomas USVI, Rodgers III-manual organ
- Memorial Moravian Church, St. Thomas USVI, Rodgers III-manual organ
- Basilica of Our Lady of Altagracia, Higuey Dominican Republic City Overview, Rodgers III-manual organ
- Cathedral of the Incarnation (Anglican), Orlando FL Official Website, Rodgers III-manual organ
