= Ahlborn =

Ahlborn is a surname. Notable people with the surname include:

- Ania Ahlborn, Polish novelist
- August Ahlborn (1796–1857), German landscape painter active in Italy
- Dirk Ahlborn, American entrepreneur
- Lea Ahlborn (1826–1897), Swedish artist and first woman to serve as royal printmaker

== See also ==
- Arkansas Department of Human Services v. Ahlborn, 2006 U.S. Supreme Court case
- Ahlborn-Galanti, U.S. organ manufacturer
