= Seeburg 1000 =

Phonograph for playing background music

The Seeburg 1000 Background Music System is a phonograph designed and built by the Seeburg Corporation to play background music from special 16 2/3 RPM vinyl records in offices, restaurants, retail businesses, factories and similar locations. Seeburg provided a service similar to that of Muzak.

== Phonograph ==
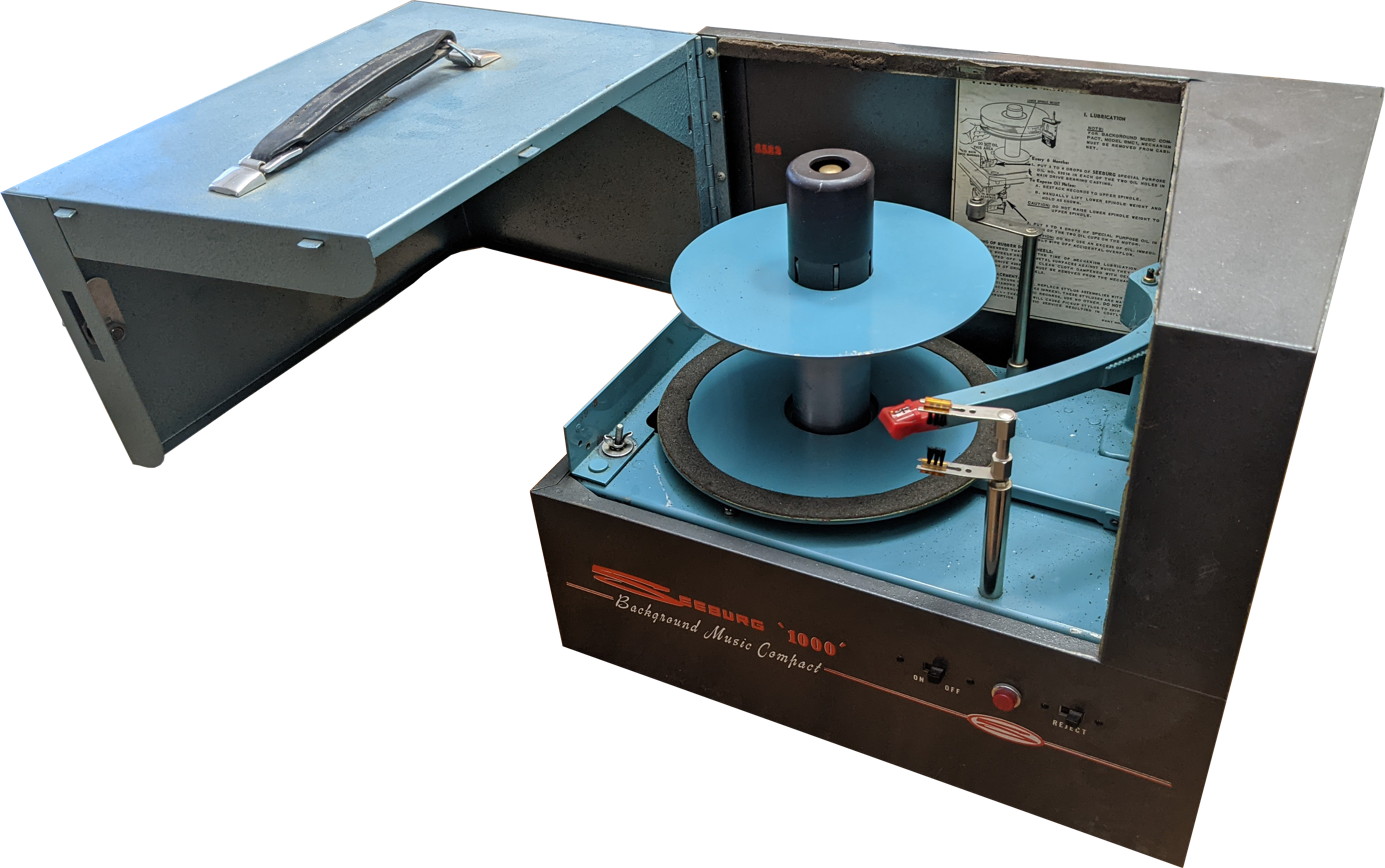
Seeburg 1000 BMC1

The Seeburg 1000 phonograph was introduced in 1959 as model BMS1. The system replaced the Seeburg Library Unit, which served the same purpose but played standard 45 rpm records. The Seeburg 1000 is enclosed in a metal cabinet 22 inches (55 cm) wide by 14 inches (35 cm) tall by 12 inches (30 cm) deep. A later version (the Seeburg Background Music Compact, model BMC1) is housed in a windowless, blue and grey painted metal box. This version contains only the record-playing mechanism, without any amplifier or timer built in.

The player is capable of playing both sides of up to 28 records and repeating the process indefinitely. The records are stacked on the spindle with the first side to be played on the bottom of the stack. A special tone arm, with two needles (one above and one below), is used to play both sides of each record. A rotating base plate below the records prevents damage to the bottom playing surface while re-stacking the records. A similar weight on top of the stack ensures stable playback of the bottom side of the topmost record.

The mechanism causes the lower portion of the spindle to rotate clockwise like an ordinary record player, while the top half of the spindle rotates counterclockwise to permit the bottom of the record to be played in the correct direction. The spindle contains three sets of retractable claws which hold the records in the upper and lower playing positions, and permit one record at a time to be dropped from the upper to the lower playing position. A release button in the top of the spindle permits the operator to retract the record-holding claws to remove the record stack.

The BMS 1000 was so called because it played both sides of 25 records, each side containing 20 songs (hence 1,000 songs). The phonographs used the old Pickering "Red-head" stereo cartridge, introduced on Seeburg jukeboxes in late 1958 for the 1959 model year. Although the mono Seeburg jukeboxes used 1 mil styluses and the stereo Seeburgs used .7 mil styluses, the background-music systems used a .5 mil stylus, but played the special mono records. The BMS phonographs were non-selectable and only played these proprietary formatted 9" records with 2" center holes - sequentially, and at 16 2/3rpm.

In 1963, Seeburg introduced the next generation BMS, the BMS2. Unlike the BMC1, The BMS2 was intended to be put on display. The BMS2 has a chrome trim and features a lighted window to show off the mechanism inside, similar in style to a jukebox. This phonograph has been nicknamed "the Microwave" in recent years due to its resemblance to the kitchen appliance. The BMS2 also uses a transistorized amplifier.

BMC phonographs lacking a power amplifier or internal speaker could have an optional preamplifier. Early preamps were tube-(valve-) type and (after 1963) transistorized. In 1963 the Seeburg BMCA1 "Companion Audio" speaker/4-watt amp unit became available, using both tubes and transistors. If more power or an amp was needed Seeburg had the HFA4-56, 60-watt tube (valve) amp available.

== Records ==
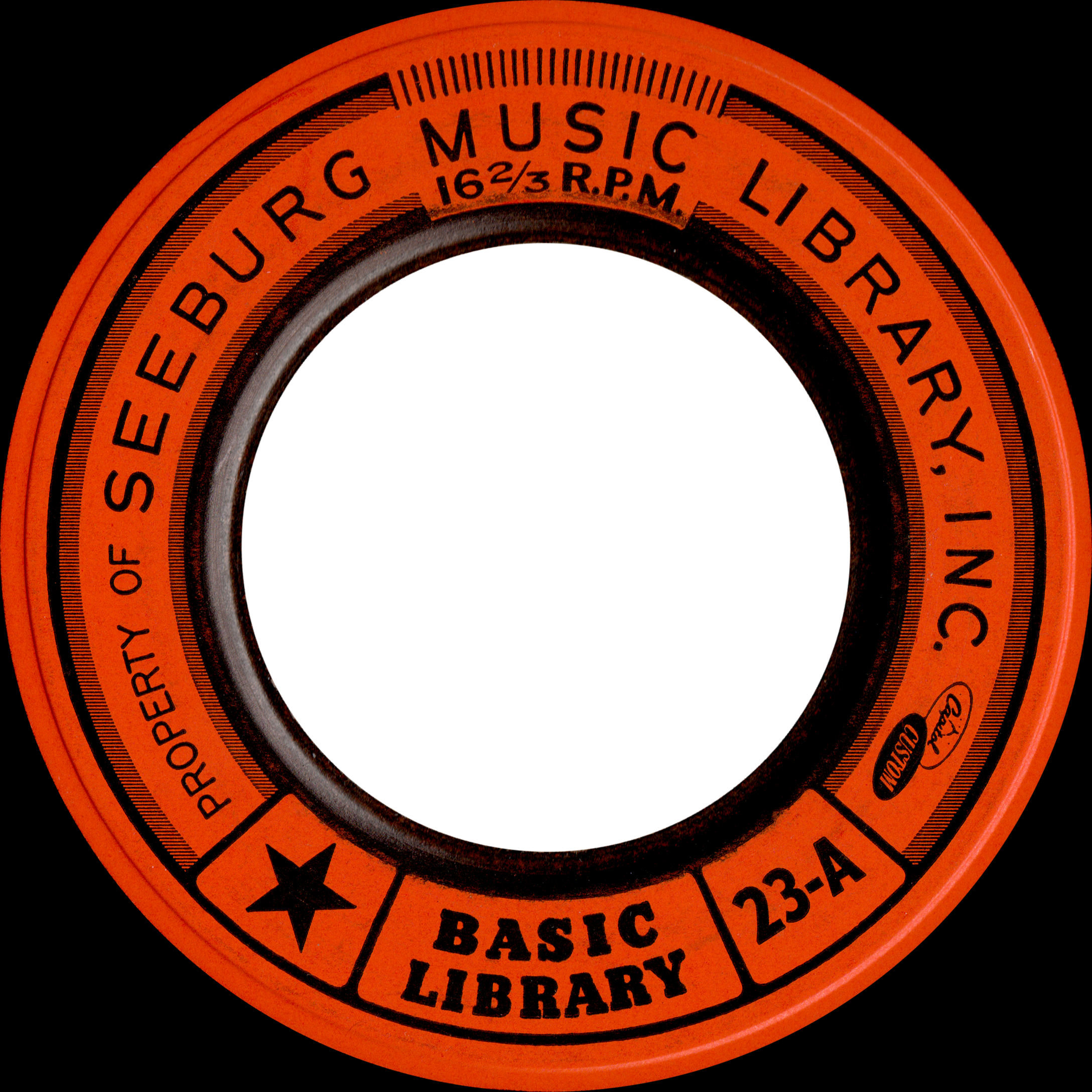
1959 Seeburg "Basic" Record

A Seeburg Background Music record is a vinyl record of a non-standard 9 inch (23 cm)-diameter size with a 2-inch (5 cm) center hole. The recording is monaural, with a playing speed of 16 2/3 rpm and a density of 420 grooves per inch. A 0.5 mil diamond stylus is used for reproduction. Each side contains approximately 40 minutes of music (typically 20 songs). Records in each series were numbered 1-25 from 1959 to the July 1st 1966 set, and 101-128 from the October 1st 1966 set all the way to the last set. These numbers meant nothing other than an indication as to where a record belonged in the stack order.

Initially, the records were distributed four times a year, in sets of five records. This number was upped to seven with the October 1st 1966 set. The operator was supposed to replace records in the system with new records of the same number (e.g. MM-125). Each box was labeled with the library type, date to place in service, and instructions for the operator (including that each record was to be returned to Seeburg after use). Upon return, the records were destroyed. A Basic library box from 1971 states that the records are the property of "Seeburg Music Library, Inc., 1510 N. Dayton St, Chicago 22, Ill".

== Music ==
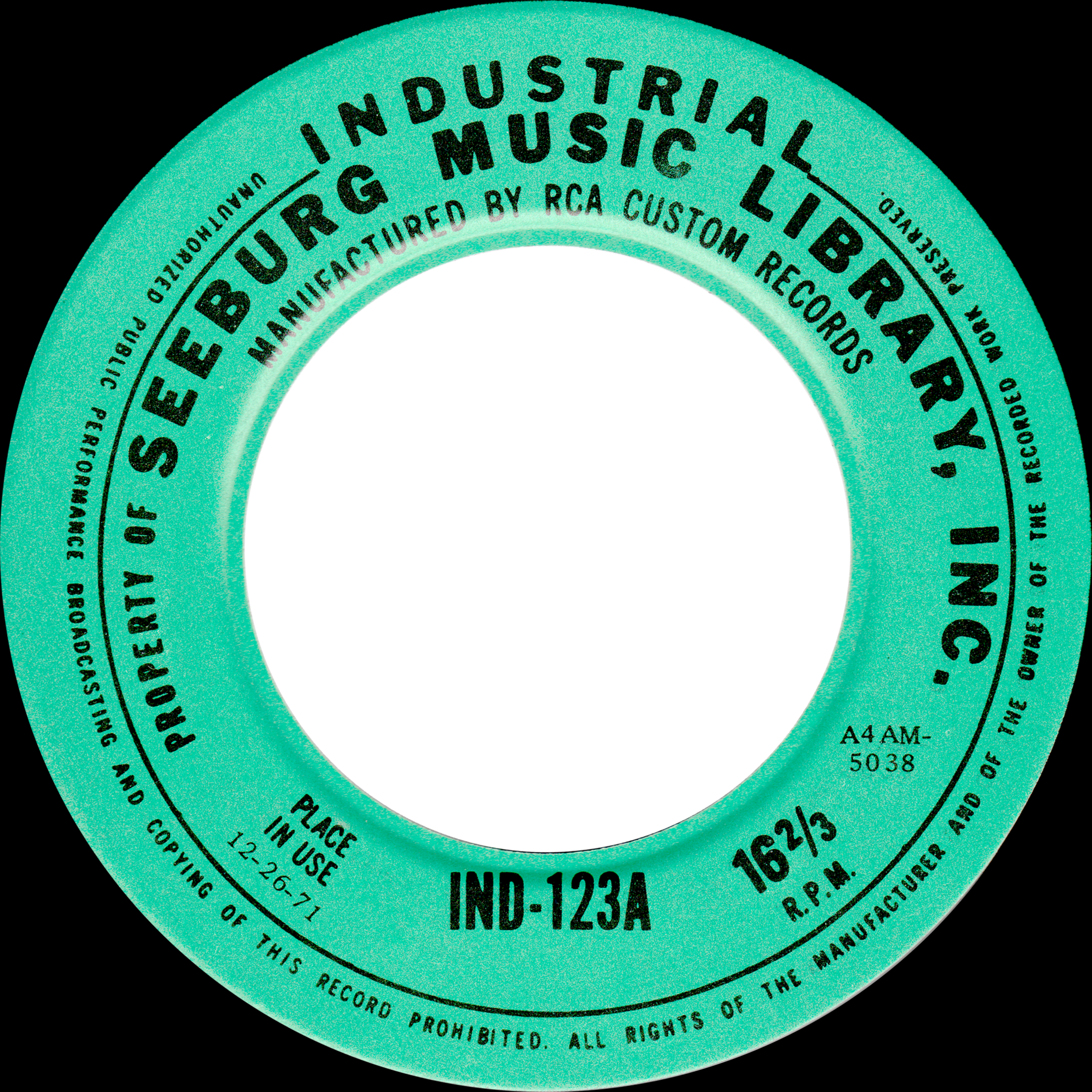
1971 Seeburg "Industrial" Record

Seeburg provided three different libraries of music for use with the Seeburg 1000 system: Basic, Mood and Industrial. In 1979 these library names were changed to Lifestyle, Mellow Mood, and Upbeat (later renamed Penthouse) respectively. The Basic library consisted of mid-tempo music selected from top 40 hits, show tunes and standards. The arrangements (created for Seeburg) were nearly all instrumental, featuring horns, strings and keyboards. The Mood library consisted of medium- to slow-tempo songs in lush arrangements (with primarily stringed instruments). The music was derived from standards, show tunes and some pop music; the first song on each side of each record was often a current pop hit. The Industrial library consisted of lively, medium- to quick-tempo music to induce workers to be more productive. This was perhaps the most varied and adventurous of the libraries; it contained polkas, mariachi music, twangy guitar, Hawaiian songs, and occasionally synthesizer.

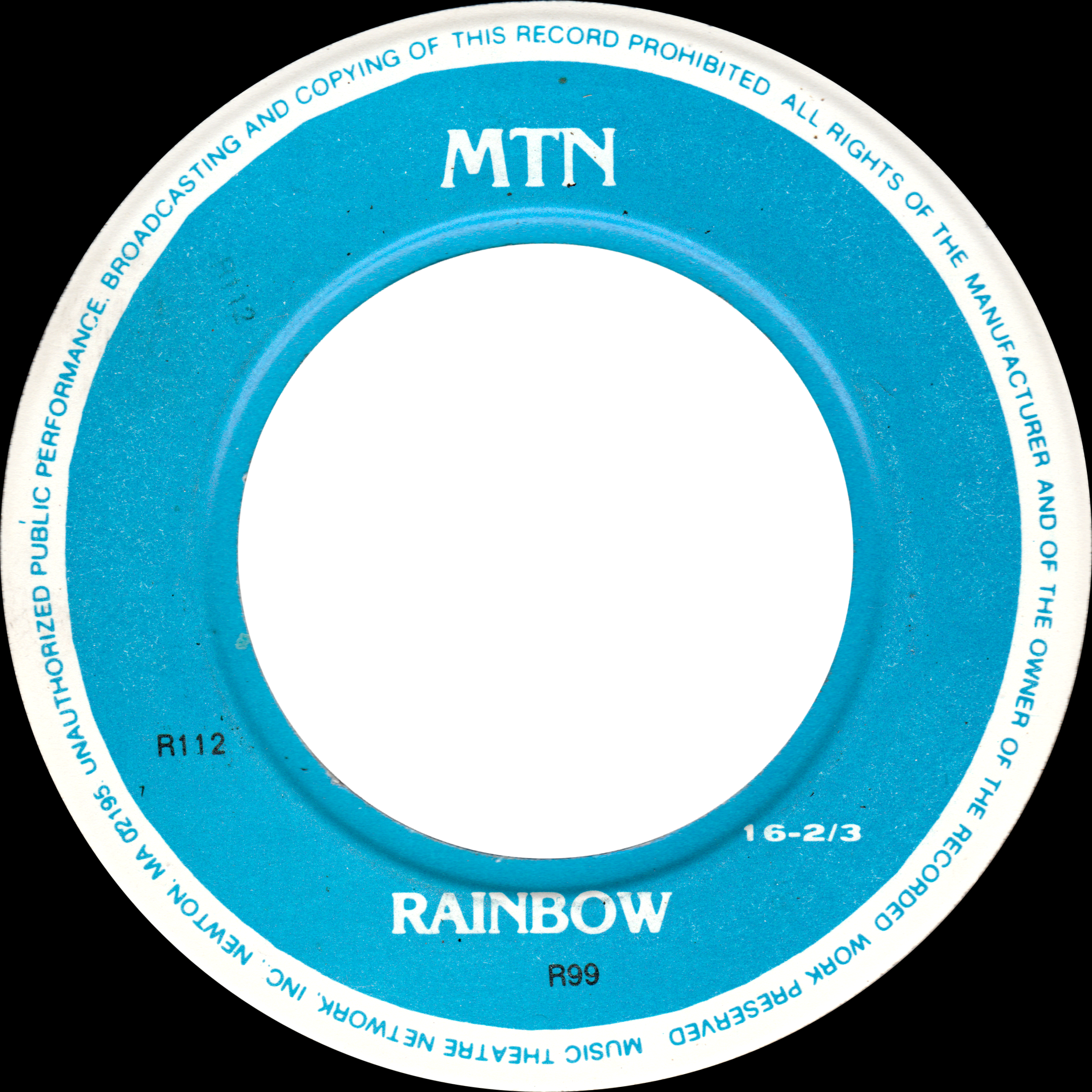
1988 MTN "Rainbow" Record, One of the last releases for the Seeburg 1000 Music Library

The first sets of Seeburg 16 rpm records issued in 1959 had a five-pointed star for the Basic and Industrial Libraries, and "MM-100" for the Mood Library. This was superseded with the first replacement record set by a notice which read "Replace No. 1", "Replace No. 5" etc. This meant "Replacement Records - Set No. 1", "Set No. 5" etc. In 1961 this was again superseded by the "place in use" dates, which remained in use through the end of 1975. For the April 1, 1976 sets, the "place in use" dates were replaced by a code: RR-66. This meant "replacement records – set #66" and the number advanced with each subsequent set. After the bankruptcy of Seeburg in 1982, the records were sent out roughly one set per year, eventually converging into single library under the MTN (Music Theater Network) label as "Rainbow". The last set of records was sent out in 1988 and bore the code R-99.

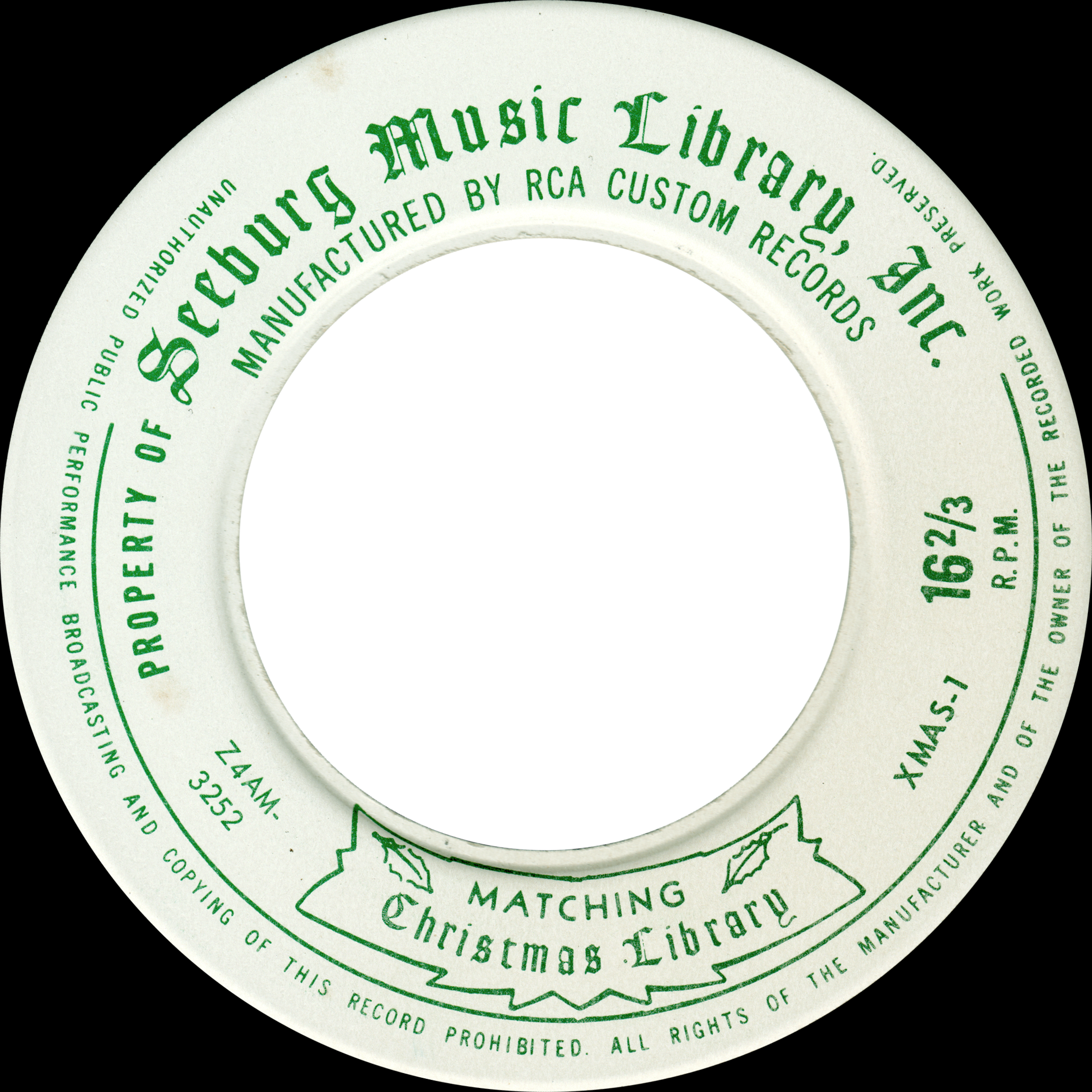
1970 Seeburg "Christmas" Record

The Christmas holiday season required a special set of records. A box of 25 Christmas records was issued to be played during the month of December. This set consisted of Christmas music, interspersed with non-holiday music. The first sets of Christmas records were made separately for each existing library, but by the early 60s were replaced with a simple "Matching Christmas Library".

It was the job of the machine operators to replace all the normal library records with Christmas records on December 1, and then replace the Christmas records with the standard libraries on December 26. This was a large undertaking in New York.

== Encore library ==
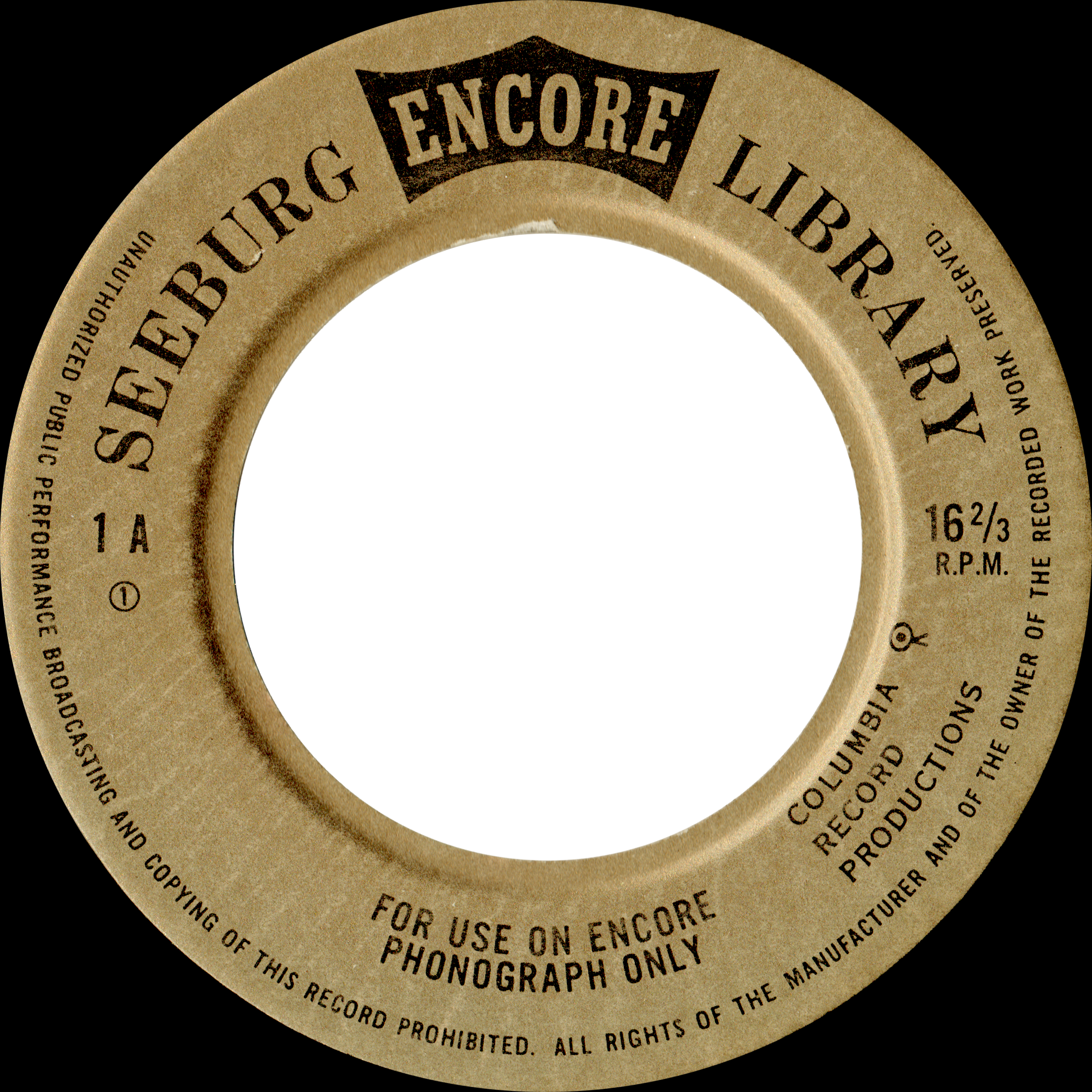
1963 Seeburg "Encore" Record

In addition to the main three libraries for the Seeburg 1000 system, Seeburg also released a line of records under the Encore library in 1963. These records used a wider groove than other Seeburg 1000 records to allow for better sound fidelity but otherwise used the same profile and speed as a conventional Seeburg 1000 record. Encore machines used the same basic mechanism as other Seeburg 1000 machines but were housed in a much larger wooden cabinet. Both the machines as well as the records were sold to store owners rather than leased through record dealers and came in sets of six. The music on the Encore series was a variety of selections from the three main "1000" libraries. The Encore library was discontinued by Seeburg in 1968.

== Third party suppliers ==
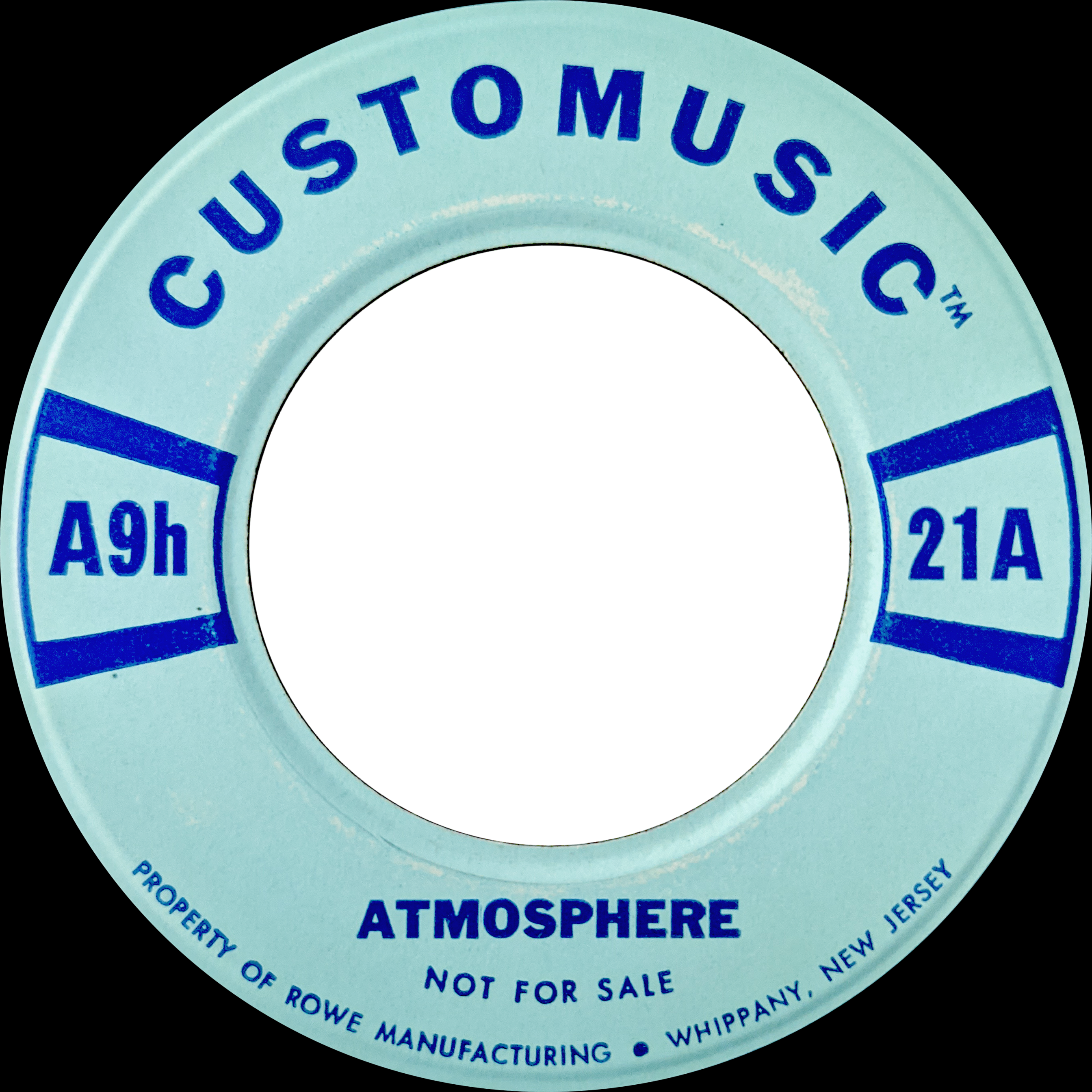
Rowe Customusic "Atmosphere" Record

While Seeburg was the primary supplier of records for their 1000 system, other companies such as Rowe, Merrimac, and Kingtone released competing libraries for the 1000 format. Rowe being the most prolific released records for all three of their libraries previously used on their numerous "Customusic" BGM formats, Commercial, Atmosphere, and Production respectively. These competing services were mostly gone by the end of the 1970s.
