= Spivey Hall =

Venue in Clayton State University

Coordinates: 33.59290°N 84.32907°W

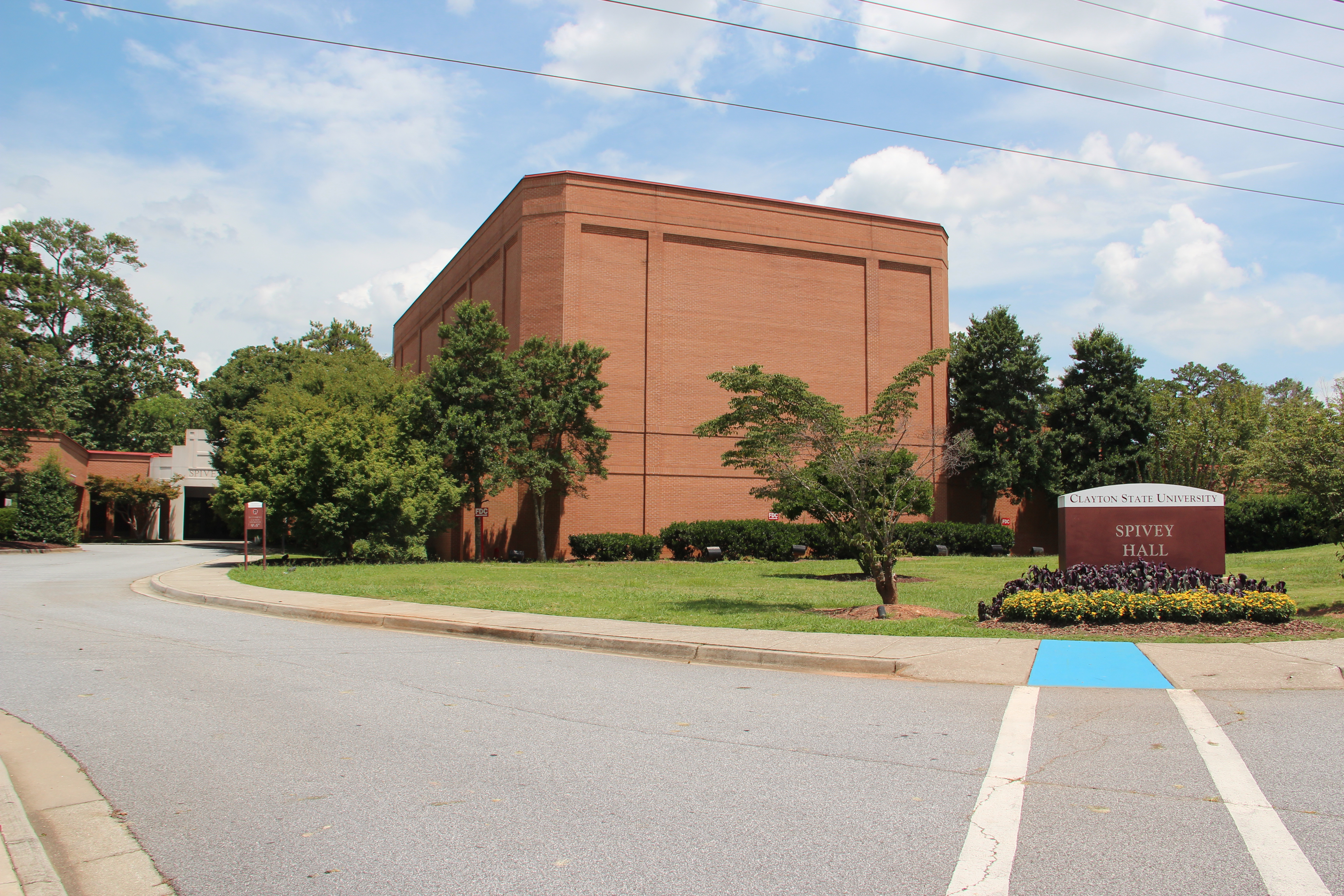
- Interactive map of Spivey Hall
- Address: 2000 Clayton State Boulevard; Morrow, Georgia; United States
- Capacity: 492

Construction
- Groundbreaking: 1988
- Opened: 1991

Website
- https://spiveyhall.org/

Spivey Hall was built in 1991 on the campus of Clayton State University in Morrow, Georgia, near Atlanta, Georgia. Its seating capacity is 492 (476 in the orchestra and 16 box seats). It is a venue for live performances of jazz and classical music in the Atlanta area.

Construction of the hall was inspired by Emilie Parmalee Spivey and Walter Boone Spivey, real estate developers in the Atlanta area. The Walter & Emilie Spivey Foundation donated $2.5 million to the construction which began in November 1988 (total cost $4.5 million). While they were closely involved in its planning, Neither Walter nor Emilie lived to see the ground breaking – but their kindness and generosity manifests itself in the beauty of Spivey Hall. Emilie died one month after completing the formal plans in 1988, yet every detail was followed faithfully through the project construction.

Spivey Hall is home to the Spivey Hall Children's Choir and Spivey Hall Young Artists. The Children's Concert Series won the Abby Award for arts education in Atlanta in 1998.

The visual and musical centrepiece of the auditorium’s design is the Albert Schweitzer Memorial Organ, a 79-rank, 3-manual, 4,413-pipe organ, built and installed by Fratelli Ruffatti of Padua, Italy. The creation of this organ was the subject of a television documentary, broadcast on PBS. The hall was constructed to create a favourable acoustic for classical music and organ recitals.

Performances in the hall are frequently broadcast on National Public Radio's “Performance Today" and the hall has attracted international attention via BBC Music Magazine and International Arts Manager.

== See also ==
- List of concert halls
