= Fratelli Ruffatti =

Famiglia Artigiana Fratelli Ruffatti

Famiglia Artigiana Fratelli Ruffatti (Ruffatti Brothers, Family of Artisans) is a manufacturer of pipe organs based in Padua, Italy.

== History ==
In 1940, Antonio Ruffatti and his two brothers founded the firm of Famiglia Artigiana Fratelli Ruffatti (Ruffatti Brothers, Family of Artisans) the full and original name of the company which remains unchanged. The firm has produced more than five hundred instruments of all sizes, in Europe, North America, Africa, Asia and Australia. The lineage and heritage of Fratelli Ruffatti continues in the twenty-first century with the second generation of Ruffatti brothers, Francesco Ruffatti and Piero Ruffatti, the sons of Antonio, who joined the firm as partners in 1968. Since their father's retirement in 1992, Francesco and Piero have shared the responsibility of running Fratelli Ruffatti.

== Design and philosophy ==
Each Fratelli Ruffatti organ is unique. The tonal planning of each instrument takes into consideration the ideas and musical needs of the customer as well as the space available and the acoustic environment. The primary objective of the aesthetic design is to blend with the existing architecture. Although most Ruffatti instruments utilize the traditional mechanical action, they also produce instruments with electro-pneumatic and all-electric actions. While Ruffattis continue to refine the sounds of Italian principals and flutes, they have added a wide variety of European and American organ sounds previously unknown in Italy, making their instruments international.

After manufacture and before shipping, each organ is completely assembled in the erecting room of the factory. Every part of the instrument is then checked to avoid any structural work to be completed at the installation site.

== Ruffatti installations ==
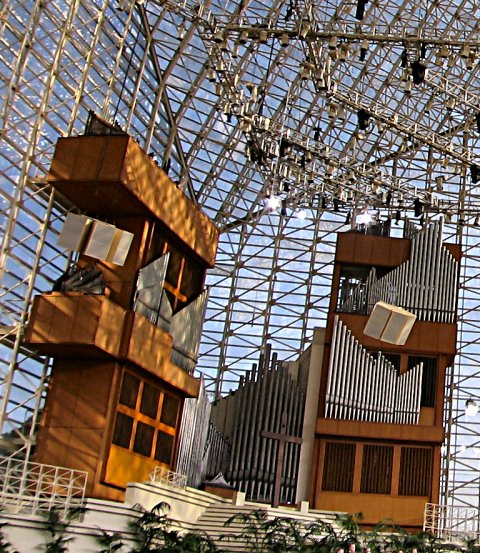
The Crystal Cathedral Ruffatti

The company is well known for the high profile instruments it has installed over the years - such as the organ at the Crystal Cathedral, the organ at the Shrine of Our Lady of Fátima in Fátima, Portugal, and the 117-rank organ designed by Diane Bish for the Coral Ridge Presbyterian Church in Fort Lauderdale, Florida.

- Spivey Hall, Clayton State University – Atlanta, Georgia, US
- Brigham Young University-Idaho – Rexburg, Idaho, US
- Crystal Cathedral – Garden Grove, California
- Cathedral of Saint Mary of the Assumption – San Francisco, California, US
- San Francisco Symphony, Davies Symphony Hall – San Francisco, California, US
- Shrine of Our Lady of Fátima – Fátima, Portugal
- Friendship Missionary Baptist Church, Charlotte, North Carolina, US
- Coral Ridge Presbyterian Church, Fort Lauderdale, Florida, US
- Uppsala Cathedral, Uppsala, Sweden
- Catedral de Nuestra Señora de la Asunción - Aguascalientes, Mexico
- First Presbyterian Church, Naples, Installation by Central Music
- Centennial Chapel, Olivet Nazarene University – Bourbonnais, Illinois, US
- St Mel's Cathedral Longford Ireland.
- The Chapel at Orlando Lutheran Towers, Orlando, Florida
