= College of Business at Clayton State University =

Business school in Atlanta, Georgia, US

The College of Business at Clayton State University
- Type: Public
- Established: 1969
- Dean: Dr. Avinandan Mukherjee
- Academic staff: 40 (incl staff)
- Undergraduates: 1200
- Postgraduates: 115
- Location: Clayton County, Georgia, USA

The College of Business at Clayton State University is an AACSB Accredited business school in Metro Atlanta, Georgia. It is the largest AACSB accredited business school in south suburban Atlanta. Faculty conduct and publish research which is then used in conjunction with case studies and various other aids to improve student learning.

== Jim Wood Speakers Series ==
The Speaker Series provides a forum for many of Georgia's business personalities to engage discussion with students. Recent speakers include:

- Elba Pareja-Gallagher, Founder ShowMe50.org, eCommerce Strategy at UPS
- Milton Jones, Market President of Bank of America
- C.D. Moody, CEO of Moody Construction
- Frank A. Argenbright, Chairman of Air Serv Corporation
- Harsha Agadi, CEO of Churches Chicken
- Joe Ruggles, President of Eleven Realty
- Glenn Farris, CEO of Biomass Gas and Electric
- Christine Jacobs, CEO of Theragenics
- Dan Cathy, COO of Chick Fil A
- James Young, CEO of Citizen's Trust Bank
- Julia Wallace, Editor of Atlanta Journal-Constitution
- Crystal Edmonson, Broadcast Editor of Atlanta Business Chronicle
- Robin Loudermilk, President and CEO of Aaron Rents, Inc.

== College of Business programs ==
=== Undergraduate Majors ===
- B.B.A. in Accounting
- B.B.A. in General Business
- B.B.A. in Marketing
- B.B.A. in Management
- B.B.A. in Supply Chain Management

=== Undergraduate Minors ===
- Business
- Entrepreneurship & Innovation
- Finance
- Marketing
- Supply Chain Management

=== Graduate programs ===
- MBA (Offered in Clayton County, Georgia)
- MBA for Working Professionals (Offered in Peachtree City, Georgia)

=== Centers and institutes ===
- Small Business Development Center (SBDC)
- Center for Supply Chain Management (SCMC)
- Center for Research on Economic Sustainability and Trends (CREST)
- Center for Entrepreneurship and Innovation (CEI)
- Center for Business and International Negotiation (CBIN)

=== Student organizations ===
- Accounting Club
- Beta Alpha Psi
- Beta Gamma Sigma
- Finance Club
- Marketing Club
- Society for Advancement of Management
- Society for Human Resource Management
- Volunteer Income Tax Assistance (VITA)
