= Rodgers Instruments =

American manufacturer

Rodgers Instruments Corporation

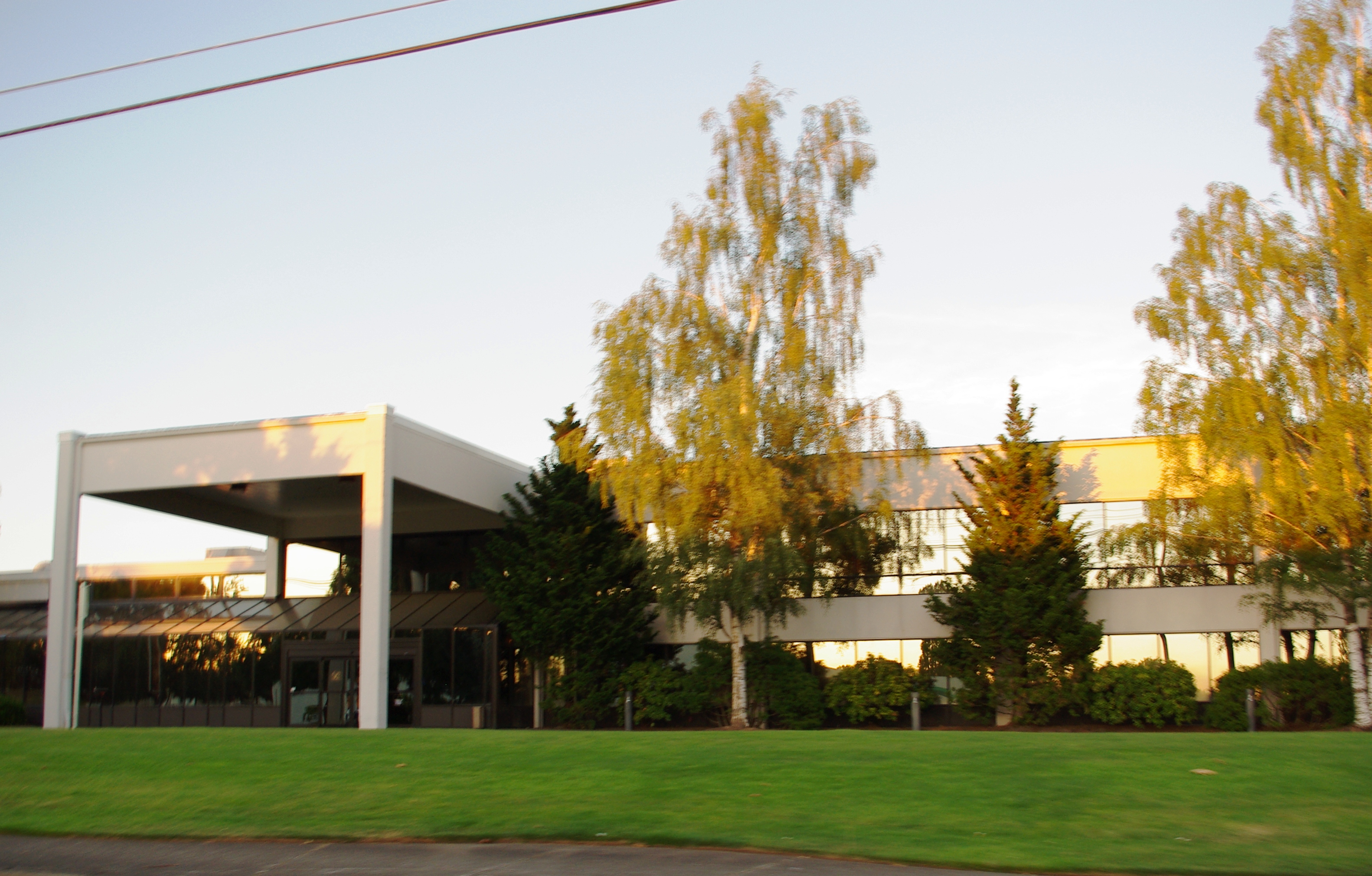
- Founded: May 1, 1958; 68 years ago
- Founder: Rodgers W. Jenkins; Fred Tinker
- Headquarters: 45.56518°N 122.89858°W, Hillsboro, Oregon, United States
- Key people: John Moesbergen, president
- Products: classical church organs (digital and pipes, also combined)
- Owner: 1988-2015 Roland; 2016-Present Vandeweerd
- Parent: Global Organ Group
- Website: Rodgers Instruments Corporation

Rodgers Instruments Corporation is an American manufacturer of classical and church organs. Rodgers was incorporated May 1, 1958 in Beaverton, Oregon by founders, Rodgers W. Jenkins and Fred Tinker, employees of Tektronix, Inc., of Portland, Oregon, and members of a Tektronix team developing transistor-based oscillator circuits. Rodgers was the second manufacturer of solid state oscillator-based organs, completing their first instrument in 1958 (the first was the Gulbransen "B" home organ, introduced in July 1957. Both the Rodgers and the Gulbransen had vacuum-tube amplifiers. In 1962, upon introducing solid-state amplifiers, Rodgers became the world's first all-transistor organ). Other Rodgers innovations in the electronic organ industry include solid-state organ amplifiers (1962), single-contact diode keying (1961), reed switch pedal keying for pedalboards (1961), programmable computer memory pistons (1966), and the first MIDI-supported church organs (1986).

Rodgers' manufacturing facility and world headquarters is located in Hillsboro, Oregon. All Rodgers organs are built in the Oregon factory.

On January 4, 2016, Roland Corporation agreed to the Dutch Vandeweerd family’s acquisition of the American company Rodgers Instruments, effective January 15, 2016. The Vandeweerd family (Global Organ Group) already owned three other organ brands: Johannus, Makin and Copeman Hart.

== Technology ==
Rodgers' success was largely due to their early innovations with solid state analog tone generation technology. Despite the fact that competitors such as Allen switched to digitally synthesized tone generation as early as 1971, Rodgers sold exclusively analog tone generation instruments until 1990.

Rodgers introduced its first digital organ on November 20, 1990, using a tone generation system Rodgers has dubbed Parallel Digital Imaging (PDI). Rodgers PDI organs use Roland DSPs and digitally sampled organ pipes for tone generation.

A feature introduced in 1993, which Rodgers has termed "Digital Domain Expression," offers swell box effects such as expression delays, high frequency damping and phase shifts of sound across a stereo field as expression shoes are opened or closed, similar to the effects produced by the swell shades on a pipe organ's swell box.

In 2014, Rodgers new Infinity II models introduced Bluetooth wireless controls, including support for reading music from an iPad.

== Pipe organs ==
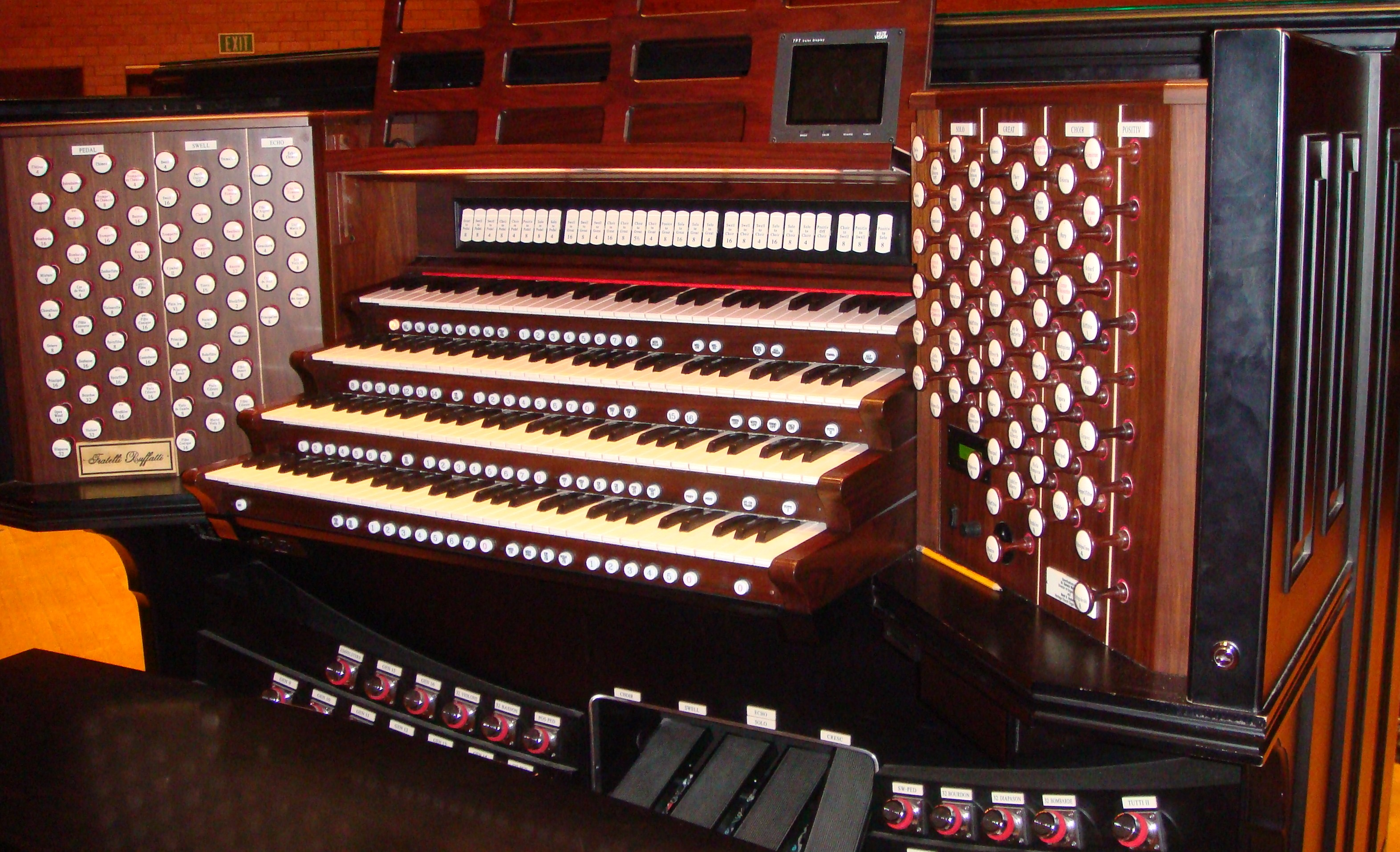
Rodgers organ console for the Fratelli Ruffatti pipe organ at BYU-Idaho

Although known primarily for its electronic organs, Rodgers has built many pipe organs and pipe/electronic combination organs.

Many Rodgers organs support the playing of actual pipe ranks in addition to their normal, electronic ranks. The first electronic organ to successfully integrate pipes and electronic tone generation was a Rodgers Gemini with Fratelli Ruffatti organ pipes installed in the Atlanta area home of Dr. Walter and Emily Spivey. It included a tuning control so the pipes and electronics could stay in tune with each other.

The largest full pipe organ produced by the company was the Second Baptist Church Houston, Texas organ with five manuals and 187 pipe ranks. It was dedicated on August 23, 1987 and featured concerts on August 23 and 24th by organist Frederick Swann. In addition, it was the featured organ of the 1988 Houston National Convention of the American Guild of Organists where it was played by organist Diane Bish. However, the organ’s console was offered for sale on eBay in 2015 and the instrument is no longer used.

In August 1991, another large all-pipe Rodgers organ installed at Glenkirk Presbyterian Church, Glendora, California was the cover feature of The American Organist, official journal of the American Guild of Organists.

== Corporate affiliations ==
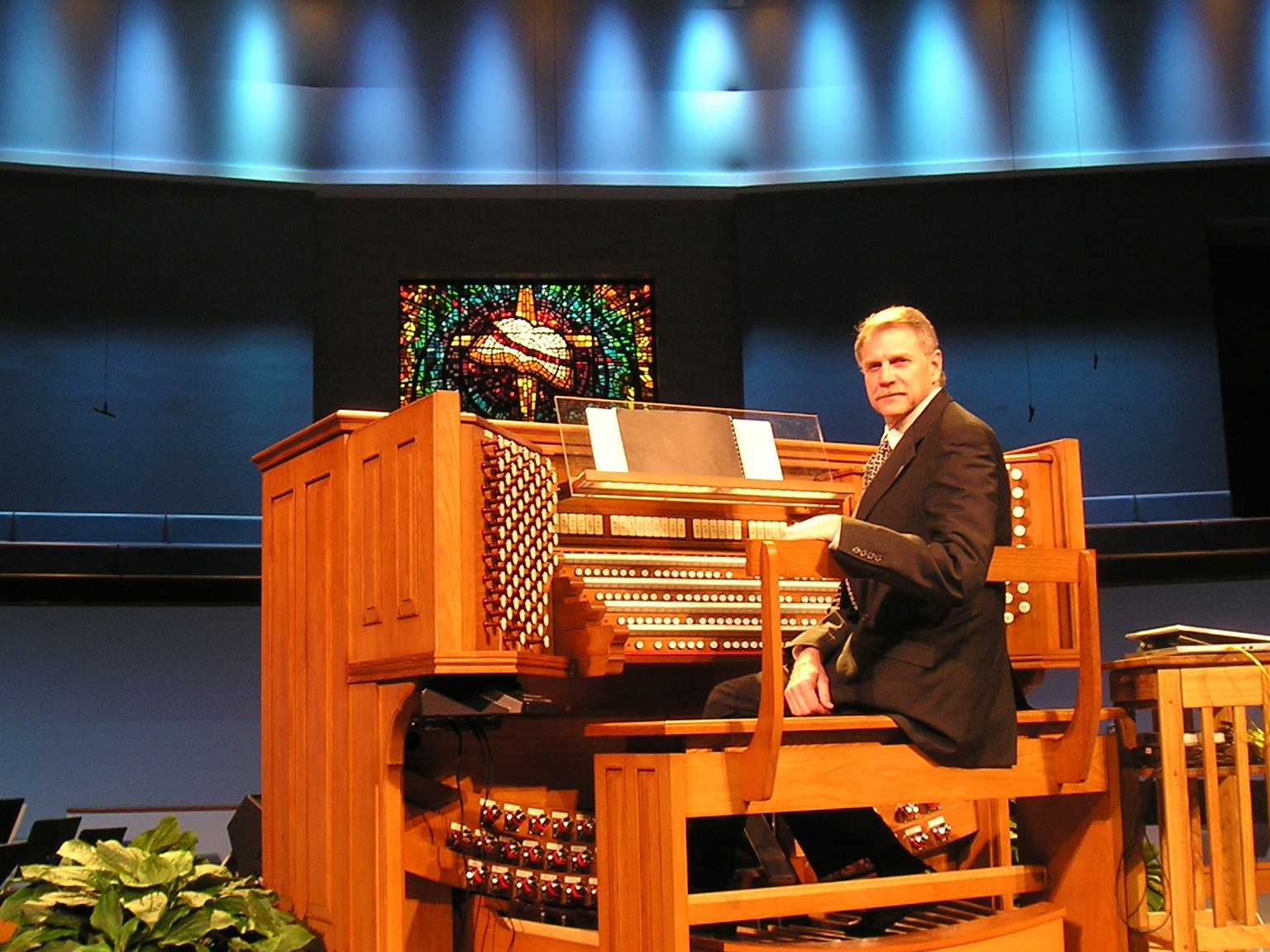
Four manual Rodgers organ installed in a church

Originally controlled by officers of Tektronix and the founding engineers, in September 1977, Rodgers became part of CBS Musical Instruments along with Steinway & Sons pianos, Fender guitars, Rhodes electric pianos, Gemeinhardt flutes, and a number of other instrument brand names. In 1985 CBS divested itself of Rodgers, along with Steinway and Gemeinhardt, all of which were purchased by Steinway Musical Properties. Beginning May 1, 1988, Roland Corporation became the parent company of Rodgers, and Rodgers its subsidiary. This lasted until 2015. In addition to its own Rodgers organs, Rodgers produced Atelier home organs and Roland Classic C-330 and C-380 organs designed for home studios. As of January 4, 2016, Vandeweerd (Owner of Johannus) has been the parent company of Rodgers.

== Touring organs ==
Organist Virgil Fox helped bring Rodgers organs into the limelight in the late 1960s and early 1970s when he used a Rodgers Touring Organ, built in 1966 and known as "Black Beauty," for his "Heavy Organ" concerts, including a 1970 all Bach performance that included a light show at the Fillmore East Auditorium in New York City.

On October 1, 1974, Rodgers’ five manual Carnegie Hall organ, designed by Virgil Fox, debuted in a sold-out Fox concert. The organ and Fox were praised by Time, United Press International, Ron Eyer in the New York Daily News, New York Post and by noted critic Harold Schonberg in The New York Times. Carnegie Hall’s International Organ Series for the Inaugural 1974-1975 Season included Fox, Pierre Cochereau, Claire Coci, Fernando Germani, Herman Berlinski, George Thalben-Ball and Richard Morris. This was the world’s first five manual and most powerful electronic organ at the time and was listed as such for a number of years in the Guinness Book of World Records.

A sister five manual instrument to the Carnegie Hall Organ, named by Fox the "Royal V", served as Fox's touring organ for the 1975-76 concert season, but proved unwieldy to tour with. The Royal V was used at Fox's funeral in the Crystal Cathedral after he died on October 25, 1980.

A second black Rodgers touring organ was active in the 1970s. The "American Beauty" was based on Rodgers's then premium three manual model, the "American Classic". Concert organists who played on this instrument or "Black Beauty" (which continued touring under Roberta Bailey Artists International well into the 80s) included Ted Alan Worth, Joyce Jones, Pierre Cochereau, Herman Berlinski, Richard Morris, Keith Chapman, Douglas Marshall, John Grady, Frederick Geoghan, William S. Wrenn, Jr., and Diane Bish.

The Royal V was, in 1983, refinished from black to white and permanently installed in the Meishusama Hall of the Shinji Shumeikai in Minsono, Japan. In mid-2004, this same organ was updated to newer Rodgers technology. Dan Miller and McNeill Robinson, consultants on the project, revised and updated the organ's tonal specification during the update to Trillium level Parallel Digital Imaging technology.

The current Rodgers touring organ is Hector Olivera's "The King", a black four manual organ featuring a custom French specification that Olivera plays in various concert venues nationally.

== Television ==
In 2006, a Rodgers Allegiant 657 was installed in the family chapel of the White Family on ABC Television's Extreme Makeover: Home Edition.

Previously, John Ratzenberger's Made in America Travel Channel show featured at segment on Rodgers filmed at Rodgers’ Hillsboro, Oregon plant. That episode still appears from time to time on the Travel Channel.

Rodgers factory is also featured in Karen Axelrod and Bruce Brumberg’s popular “Watch it Made in the U.S.A.” books profiling interesting factory tours of American manufacturing facilities.

A four-manual Rodgers organ, formerly the residence organ of Dr. Frederick Swann, is heard and seen weekly on the Hour of Power broadcast.

== Availability ==
The availability of Rodgers Instruments is ensured by the distribution and the sales of an international dealer network. The factory to produce these organs in the United States was sold by previous owners of Rodgers ie Roland . Currently consoles are constructed in Holland and organs are assembled in the United States to avoid excessive duties and tariffs. These include Rodgers Organs in Canada, ChurchOrganWorld in the UK and Rodgers Organs in Germany.

== See also ==
- Frederick Swann
- Pierre Cochereau
- Johannus (Vandeweerd company's Organ brand. Vandeweerd is New owner of Rodgers)
- Roland Corporation (Rodgers builds Roland Atelier organs and digital pianos)
- Virgil Fox played Rodgers' "Black Beauty" and "Royal V" organs in his "Heavy Organ" tours.
