= Diane Bish =

American organist, composer, conductor

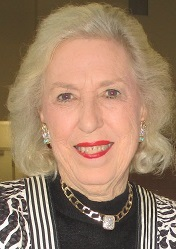
- Born: Diane Joyce Bish; May 25, 1941 (age 85); Wichita, Kansas, U.S.
- Education: University of Oklahoma
- Occupations: Organist, composer, conductor
- Years active: 1960s–present
- Agent: JEJ Artists
- Known for: The Joy of Music television program
- Parent(s): Howard Leroy Bish, Esther Jeanette Schuessler
- Website: dianebish.org

Diane Joyce Bish (born May 25, 1941) is an American organist, composer, conductor, as well as executive producer and host of The Joy of Music television series. As a concert organist, she performs at concerts throughout North America and Europe. Bish also continues to tape episodes for her television series by visiting notable organs throughout the world.

== Education and personal life ==
Diane Joyce Bish was born in Wichita, Kansas, the youngest daughter of Howard Leroy Bish and his wife Esther Jeanette, born Schuessler. Her great-grandparents, George Harold Schuessler and Magdalena Bender, migrated from Eschelbach, Germany, to Furley, Kansas, during the 1870s. Bish changed her middle name from "Joyce" to "Joy" after graduating from high school.

Bish began piano lessons when she was 6 years old and started organ lessons at age 14. She noted that her foundation in piano gave her the background needed to succeed with organ studies, which required not only excellent keyboard technique but also added in the pedal.

Bish graduated from Wichita East High School in Wichita, Kansas, in 1959. She had played on the 1925 Austin Organ installed in the school auditorium. In 1984, she returned there to play a benefit concert, which raised enough money for the organ to be restored. She became interested in the organ as a young child when listening to the Mormon Tabernacle organist Alexander Schreiner on Sunday morning programs on the radio, as well as recordings of E. Power Biggs.

Bish began studying organ as a student of Dorothy Addy, who challenged her to learn much of the classic organ repertoire during her high school years, which helped her later when she needed a variety of music for concerts and programs. In college, she studied under Mildred Andrews. Later, she was a recipient of Fulbright and French government grants for study in Amsterdam with Gustav Leonhardt, and in Paris with Nadia Boulanger and Marie-Claire Alain. Bish credited Leonhardt with teaching her "the art of music." Leonhardt taught both the harpsichord and the organ and emphasized articulation and spacing in his lessons.

Bish began her college career on a full scholarship at Asbury College in Kentucky, which had a four-manual Austin pipe organ. In her junior year, Bish transferred to the University of Oklahoma, after auditioning to become a student of Mildred Andrews at the university. After receiving her Bachelor of Music degree, Bish stayed at the university to earn a Master of Music degree.

While at the University of Oklahoma, Bish joined the Mu Kappa chapter of Mu Phi Epsilon, an international, co-educational professional music fraternity that is composed of collegiate chapters, alumni chapters, and allied members. She joined the organization for the camaraderie of fellow musicians as well as the opportunities it offered, such as musical activities and competitions.

On October 31, 2002, in Bloomington, Indiana, a fire consumed the home that Bish shared with harpist Susann McDonald. Among the many personal possessions lost were a Yamaha grand piano and Rodgers digital organ, but both women escaped without injuries. Bish also lost most of her signature concert attire in the fire.

While practice is important for a musician's success, she has also enjoyed sports and being with friends and family. She describes herself as a people person and enjoys traveling, fishing, snow skiing, and animals, especially Poodles or Maltese dogs. When asked if she has any vices, Bish admits to procrastination at times, as well as taking a break from 3 to 4 p.m. to "have a cup of coffee, some chocolate, and I sit with my dog and just enjoy being alive." As of 2020, she makes her home in Naples, Florida.

Her advice for young musicians is to determine what they want to do and then work hard at it. It is important to learn good technique with a serious teacher. It is also important to think about musical interpretation. She noted, "Don't be a robot – technique is one thing, but without the heart, the soul, the music doesn't touch people."

== Career ==
After graduating with her master's degree, Bish was the organist at the East Heights Methodist Church in Wichita, Kansas. She left for a year to study in Amsterdam, and then returned to the church organist position. She also taught organ and harpsichord at Friends University for two years, along with continuing to offer concerts and lectures. In 1969, Bish received a scholarship from the French government to return to Europe for further study with Marie-Claire Alain. Upon her return from Europe, she moved to Wichita Falls, Texas to teach for a year, before realizing that, instead of teaching, she wanted to have a church job and continue her performance career.

Besides her teachers, three organists, in particular, had an influence on her musical style. She used to listen to recordings of E. Power Biggs, as well as Alexander Schreiner, who was the organist on the Sunday morning Mormon Tabernacle programs on the radio. In addition, she was acquainted with the organist Virgil Fox. Bish has stated that she has tried to combine the styles of Biggs and Fox, while choosing inspirational literature that makes use of the full resources of the organ, as Schreiner did.

Beginning in the 1970s, Bish served for more than 20 years as organist and artist-in-residence at the Coral Ridge Presbyterian Church in Fort Lauderdale, Florida, where she designed the 117-rank Ruffatti organ in the sanctuary. She also co-founded the church's concert series as well as the Church Music Explosion international workshop for church musicians. Bish continues to perform occasionally at the church, most recently in an April 12, 2019 concert that featured two of her works, Symphony of Hymns and the Passion Symphony, which were written for the Ruffatti organ.

Bish has been on television for most of her career. Her first regular appearances were on the Coral Ridge Hour, a weekly television series that was produced at Coral Ridge Presbyterian Church. In 1982, she began recording The Joy of Music.

No longer resident organist at the Coral Ridge Presbyterian Church, Bish made frequent concert appearances at recitals throughout North America. During her concerts, she shows the audience what the organ she is playing that day can do, making sure to include music that includes stops "from the tiniest flutes to big, thunderous sounds." She also explains the music by introducing nearly every number played.

Even when Bish was playing full-time at Coral Ridge Presbyterian Church, she was free to travel as a concert organist. When playing a new organ, she first registers it, or memorizes where all of the stops are. She explained, "The first thing I do when I sit down at a new organ is just register it. I don't actually play that much because it's very important to know, first of all, where everything is. I don't preset a lot of things. It's just something I've had to do, and I find whether you have a little time or a lot, you tend to take the time you have." While it can be a challenge to play different organs, it is also rewarding to figure out how to produce different effects on new organs.

During the COVID-19 pandemic, which necessitated the cancellation of many church services and concerts, Bish found a creative way to bring the joy of the organ to her neighbors on Easter Sunday 2020. She played a concert from her home organ, using an additional sound system through large, opened patio doors. More than 150 people attended.

Bish has written numerous musical compositions, including original works and arrangements of hymns and other works, and writes everything out by hand. She has to be in the mood for the work of composing, noting that she needs to "be at peace, and be composed to compose." Woodruff noted that Bish has "produced her richest compositions at the happiest points in her life, in the moments of great personal triumph. Unlike many other composers, Diane cannot compose as an escape from sorrow or frustration. She must be in a content and cheerful frame of mind."

Bish has also completed numerous hymn arrangements. In a hymn arrangement, she tries to bring out the melody while making use of rhythm. She laments "unimaginative" arrangements, noting that "we have a whole orchestra to use in terms of the organ, and in my hymn arrangements, I try to utilize them all." Bish also reads the verses of the hymn so that her arrangements are reflective of the message of the hymn.

In addition to her work as a recitalist, television host/producer, and composer, Bish is also an organ designer. As noted above, Bish designed the Ruffatti organ that was installed in 1974 at the Coral Ridge Presbyterian Church, working with Piero Ruffatti and architect Harold Wagoner. A dedication service and recital by Bish were held on January 5, 1975.

The Diane Bish Signature Series of organs is available through the Allen Organ Company. In an interview where she was asked about these organs, Bish said, "My organs have more of the French in them, the reeds are more French. They’ll play anything in the strings. That’s one thing I really like in an organ — good strings. They’re very rich, very beautiful and warm, and the reeds are very fiery and exciting. The flutes are also very distinct, whether they’re a German flute or a harmonic flute or whatever, they’re very distinct. That’s very important in an organ. So I tried to pull all those aspects together in my organs." The Diane Bish Signature Series of organs also include special console finishes and six complete stop lists, including Classic Allen, Cavaillé-Coll, Schlicker, English Cathedral, Aeolian-Skinner and Arp Schnitger.

Bish is known for her elegant concert attire and sparkly organ shoes. Many of her gowns are custom-made or adapted from clothing bought off the rack. Bish said that her attire helps to create a concert performance atmosphere, noting that other concert performers do not wear black robes to perform. She regularly receives comments from fans about her attire.

The organ shoes that Bish wears are gold with rhinestones and are designed by her manager, Janet Jarriel. Originally, the rhinestones were multicolored, but in 2006, the shoe design was changed to use white rhinestones, which also surround the heel of the shoes.

One book has been written about Bish and her life. This book, First Lady of the Organ, Diane Bish: A Biography, by Warren L. Woodruff, was partially based on a doctoral dissertation by Woodruff about Bish and her work.

Bish herself is also an author. In 1977, she published Church Music Explosion, which provided information and inspiration for church musicians, especially church organists. The book was updated with a new edition in 1982. The book provided guidance for the organist in selecting music, playing for worship services, working with others, and establishing a concert series. In addition, there was advice on how to demonstrate the organ to children, to build an audience for the future, along with suggested repertoire listings that could be used with both choirs and organs.

In 2013, Bish authored a book of faith entitled Warnings! End Time Scenarios, which was dedicated to the victims of the terrorist attacks of September 11, 2001. This 110-page book featured scenarios of people who unexpectedly faced life-changing challenges and disasters; each chapter began with Bible verses that were appropriate to the situations described. In the introduction to the book, Bish noted that she had been reading various print and online sources that led her to think about how contemporary events mirrored end-time events predicted in the Bible. Accordingly, the purpose of the book was to issue a reminder that people should "hear the life-changing good news of the gospel" before it was too late.

Faith has been an important element for Bish throughout her career. She noted that she always tries to include music that provides spiritual inspiration in each of her concerts. In addition, despite her renowned talent, Bish always attributes her success to God. Her sister, Judy (Bish) Priest, was quoted as saying: "“Diane is very, very gifted,” she said, “but she always gives God the glory. She knows where her gifts come from.”

=== The Joy of Music Program ===
There are three purposes for The Joy of Music program, according to Bish: "To feature great churches and organs with performances of classical and sacred music; to reflect 'Excellence in all things and all things to God's glory;' and to educate, inspire, and enrich the lives of people through God's gifts of creation."

The idea for what became The Joy of Music began when Bish listened to recordings of E. Power Biggs playing famous European organs. When she was in high school, she thought it would be nice for listeners to be able to see the organs and their surroundings as well as hear them. After graduating from college, when Bish was studying in Europe and playing different European organs, she continued to think about her dream of eventually hosting a television program.

During her time at Coral Ridge, Bish began producing the weekly television program of organ music, The Joy of Music. A music writer for the South Florida Sun-Sentinel newspaper said in 1986 that Bish "combines masterful music and religion in a life filled with church work, concerts, and writing and producing her own TV show". It had taken ten years of work to make the new program a reality.

Coral Ridge Presbyterian Church had constructed a new church, with a new Ruffatti organ, in 1974. The new church had television cameras that were used to broadcast the services. Between 1971 and 1981, Bish wrote proposals for a potential series but was unable to garner any interest. Then, in 1981, a supporter donated $20,000 and Bish was able to create two pilot episodes in 1982. The pilot episodes included a Christmas program and a program for trumpet and organ. The donor also knew the owner of Trinity Broadcasting Network, Paul Crouch. From this contact, Trinity Broadcasting put The Joy of Music into a national 8:30 p.m. slot on Friday evenings, giving the new program an audience of millions.

By 1984, Bish began traveling to Europe to record episodes on famous organs throughout the continent. These episodes combined music and a travelogue with information about the organs, churches, cities, art, and scenery. Bish stated that the travel aspect of the programs helped to bring in additional viewers. In addition, she played a variety of music on the program, so that every listener could find something enjoyable. This was especially important to be able to reach listeners who did not know much about the organ.

The Joy of Music tapings have occurred in many famous cathedrals on well-known organs. Bish noted that when playing the organs that were also played by Bach, Handel, or Mozart, "you're touching history when you do that. It's pretty amazing, really." When determining the locale for a taping, 90 percent of the time, Bish first decides on an organ that she would like to feature, and then builds the tour around that instrument.

Bish serves as executive producer of the program and is involved in all aspects of its production. She spends a lot of time at The Joy of Music office taking care of paperwork and planning. She writes all of the scripts, drawing upon her earlier writing experience as the editor of her high school newspaper to write succinct commentary for the show. When writing the commentary, she does all of the research on the music she will play, information on the composers, the churches and organs, and the locations where she visits. Bish also enjoys working with guest artists, including violinists, choirs, brass ensembles, and even an Alp hornist.

When planning a tour, Bish first selects the location and the guest artists. She then selects the music and begins to prepare it, while doing the research for the programs. Once on location, all of the musical pieces and all of the introductory and regional scenes are shot live.

Once the taping has concluded, Bish handles the initial review of the finished footage to decide what will be included in each program. She is also responsible for approval of the program once the footage is arranged in its final production stage. One taping trip can result in over forty hours of footage to edit, and a two-week trip can include six to eight tapings.

It can take a year to plan a European tour because the churches, guest artists, and camera crews have to be lined up. Fundraising also needs to occur. In addition, Bish works with a tour company to open the trips up to fans and friends, which are then advertised on The Joy of Music website.

The majority of current European Joy of Music trips use a riverboat for travel between sites. This has made touring easier, because there is no need to pack and unpack when moving from city to city. At each stop, the group visits a church and Bish records for the program. After the records are finished, Bish then tapes the introductions and information shots that are included on the program.

For the first 15 years of the program, 26 episodes per year were produced, each of which would be repeated once to cover a 52-week programming span. Currently, fewer programs are produced each year because of expense. When producing the full 26 episodes per year, it was necessary to raise an average of US$350,000–$400,050. Ninety percent of the funding for the program comes from donations. Other funding and support is provided by corporate sponsors.

Production of The Joy of Music is expensive because when traveling, the guest artists, crew, and equipment must be transported to the taping sites. Proper equipment must be obtained. Following a taping trip, there are editing hours, along with production, duplication, and distribution costs, and staff costs to prepare the files for television stations. Bish once noted, "We literally sweat it out every month and pray that the money will come in. We do so much on so little that Hollywood would laugh at our small budget for one show."

Bish has encountered challenges when filming The Joy of Music. It is sometimes difficult to secure permission to tape in churches and cathedrals because there have been problems in the past with other television crews at these locations. In addition, scheduling time in the churches can be difficult. Bish related the time when her crew had to start taping at midnight because there was a light show and a trumpet recital scheduled there first. At the Strasbourg Cathedral (episode 4004), filming had to be done in the middle of the night, and there were 130 steps plus a walk out onto the roof in order to reach the organ loft. The organ loft was mounted 80 feet high on a wall, and the camera person was afraid of heights. Furthermore, the restrooms were downstairs. There were also environmental issues, such as at the Ettal Monastery (episode 8503) in Bavaria that was so cold that everyone had to wear coats, Bish had to warm her hands with a hair dryer between pieces, and the soloist's breath could be seen on the tape of the program. The console of the organ caught on fire in Notre Dame and lightning struck the church where Bish was to play in Germany.

Bish does not often have the time to rehearse extensively prior to taping a program. Due to scheduling, The Joy of Music team is generally allowed only one day at a location. She sometimes can rehearse for only an hour and a half prior to recording, while the camera crew sets up. The churches generally do not close because of the taping, so there is background noise to contend with during taping. The actual recording takes place over three to four hours, followed by taping of the introduction and information sections for the program. Outdoor filming of the surrounding area also has to be done. The whole process can take up to 14 to 16 hours in one day. Once all of the work is finished, Bish and her crew go to eat.

As of 2018, The Joy of Music continues to feature her performances, taped on location at prominent organs in North America and Europe. The Joy of Music is seen in North America via independent, faith-based, and satellite networks, and selected PBS stations. The show has an international audience via The Church Channel, BibelTV, Roku, VelugaTV, Gospel Channel, Alfa/Omega TV, and YouTube. The program can be seen by over 300,000 people worldwide on a weekly basis. The program receives letters from many different countries, including Ghana, Thailand, Uganda, and Italy. In 2017, a Joy of Music live stream was added to the show's YouTube channel to enable listeners to tune in 24-hours per day.

Since the program's beginning in the early 1980s, Bish has recorded over 500 episodes, each of which shows her playing one or more different pipe or digital organs. Many people tell her that they began playing the organ because of the Joy of Music program. Bish's ability to demonstrate the variety of sounds and volume levels that an organ can produce has inspired new organists. One organist, Stephen Price, noted that he was "blown away" when he first saw Bish on the Joy of Music.

== Awards and honors ==
Bish began winning organ competitions during college. In her junior and senior years at the University of Oklahoma, she placed first in the American Guild of Organists' Competition. She also won the National Organ Competition of the National Federation of Music Clubs, as well as the Original Composition Contest of the Mu Phi Epsilon National Competition.

In 1989, Bish was awarded the National Citation by the National Federation of Music Clubs of America, considered to be the Federation's highest honor; this award was previously given to other music legends including Leonard Bernstein, Eugene Ormandy, Van Cliburn, and Robert Shaw. In 1994, she received the Elizabeth Mathias Award, one of Mu Phi Epsilon's highest honors.

On April 29, 2016, Bish was awarded the inaugural Distinguished Career Award by the New York City Chapter of the American Guild of Organists, presented to her at the historic Marble Collegiate Church. On November 4, 2016, Bish was named the organist emerita of Coral Ridge Presbyterian Church. Also in November 2016, Bish was honored as one of the 2016 Women of Distinction by Celebrating Women International (CWI) in Nassau, Bahamas. This award is reserved for women who have made significant contributions worldwide in many fields, including the arts.

On April 7–8, 2018, Bish was honored by her alma mater, the University of Oklahoma. The American Organ Institute at the University of Oklahoma held a Gala Weekend in her honor, which included a private master class, a gala dinner, and a special concert, which featured many of her musical works. A scholarship in her name was also established.

== Discography ==
Bish has made over thirty recordings on many of the great organs of the world, including the celebrated Müller organ of the St.-Bavokerk (or Grote Kerk) in Haarlem, Netherlands, Canterbury Cathedral, and Notre Dame Cathedral in Paris. She is the first American woman to record at the organ of Freiburg Cathedral in Freiburg, Germany. Her recordings include music for organ and orchestra, brass and organ, cello and organ, most of the great masterpieces for solo organ, original compositions and hymn arrangements.

Selected recordings

- Artistry of Diane Bish (1978)
- Christmas Festival (1970)
- Favorites from Freiburg Cathedral
- Glorious Pipes (1990)
- The Glory of the Organ (1980)
- Great European Organs (1990), featuring organs of Austria, France, Germany, and the Netherlands
- Hymns on Coral Ridge Organ
- The Joy of Christmas (1980), accompanying the Diane Bish Chorale at organ
- The Joy of Music presents Hymns and Classics (1990)
- Morning Has Broken (1989)
- Pipes and More Pipes (1978), organ and bagpipes
- Praise to the Lord (1985)
- The Passion Symphony (1979)
- Sixty-six hundred voices of praises

== Works ==
Bish has published seven books and numerous solo pieces for organ, along with arrangements of various hymns including "Christ the Lord Is Risen Today". Her compositions include:

- Festival Te Deum, for organ and orchestra
- Lead On, O King Eternal, for organ and choir
- Joy of Music, organ settings of hymns
- Passion Symphony, for organ and narrator
- Symphony of Psalms, for organ, choir, orchestra and soloist
- Morning Has Broken, for organ, choir, orchestra and narrator.
- German Carol Fantasy, for organ solo
- Dance of the Trumpets, for organ solo
- Introduction, Theme and Variations on "All Creatures of Our God and King", for solo organ

Her books include:

- Church Music Explosion
- Warnings! End Times Scenarios
