= Seeburg Corporation =

Defunct American manufacturer of automated musical equipment

- Type: Music
- Founded: 1902
- Defunct: 1982
- Products: Jukeboxes; vending machines; background music equipment

Seeburg was an American design and manufacturing company of automated musical equipment, such as orchestrions, jukeboxes, and vending equipment.

Seeburg was considered to be one of the "big four" coin-operated phonograph manufacturers, alongside AMI, Wurlitzer, and Rock-Ola. At the height of jukebox popularity, Seeburg machines were synonymous with the technology and a major quotidian brand of American teenage life. The company went out of business after being sold to Stern Electronics in 1982.

== History ==
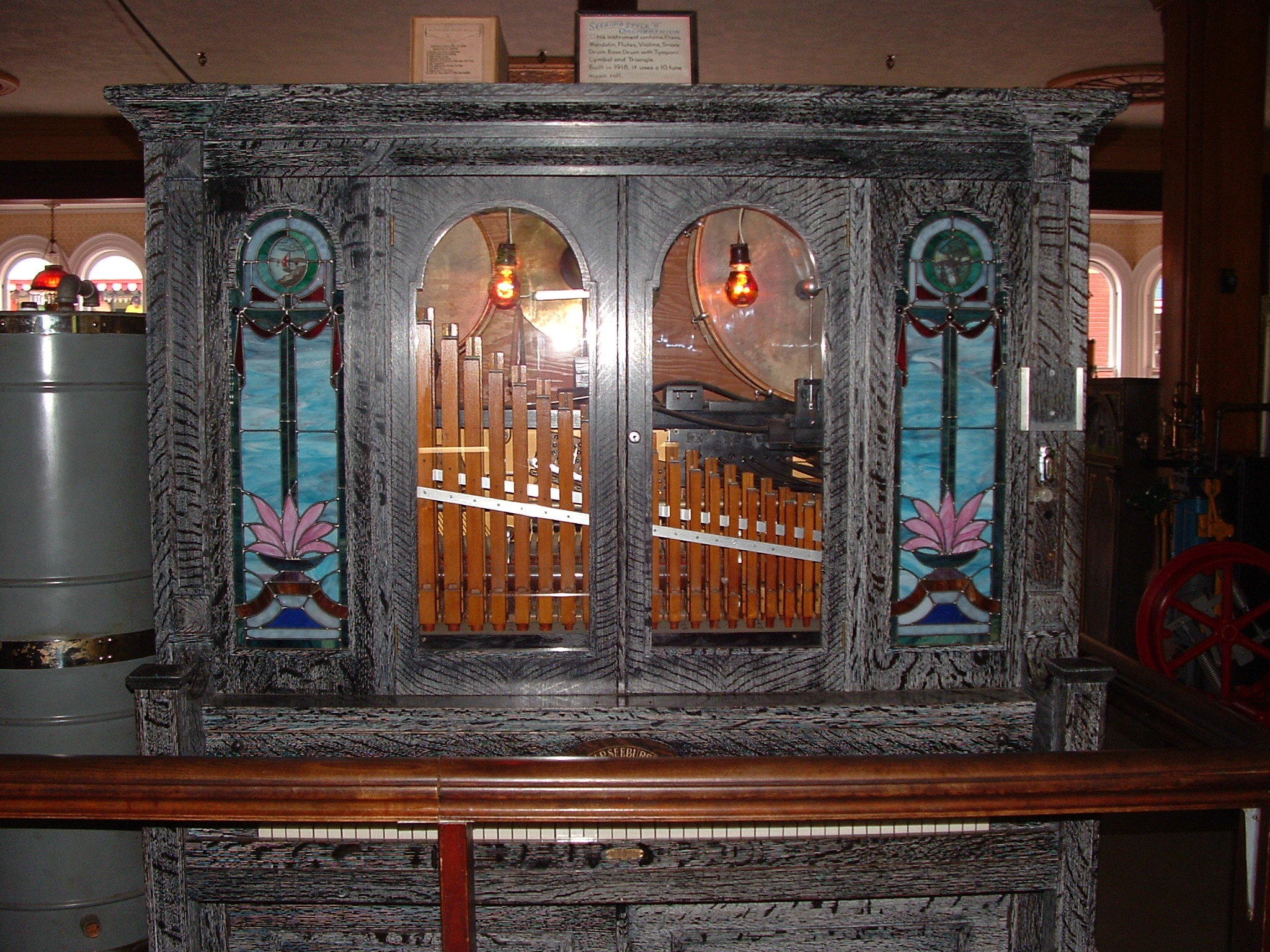
1918 Seeburg Orchestrion, "Style G" used a 10-song music roll and played multiple wind, string, and percussion instruments.

The company was founded by Justus Percival Sjöberg from Gothenburg, Sweden. He moved to the United States after graduating from Chalmers University of Technology and used an Americanized spelling of his surname for the company. Automated musical equipment, such as jukeboxes and orchestrions, was manufactured under the J.P. Seeburg and Company name for most of its early years. Until 1956, the company was family-owned.

The Seeburg Style L (Lilliputian) Nickelodeon was a coin-operated 54 note player piano with its suction pump driven by an electric motor. An example can be seen at the Musical Museum, Brentford, England.

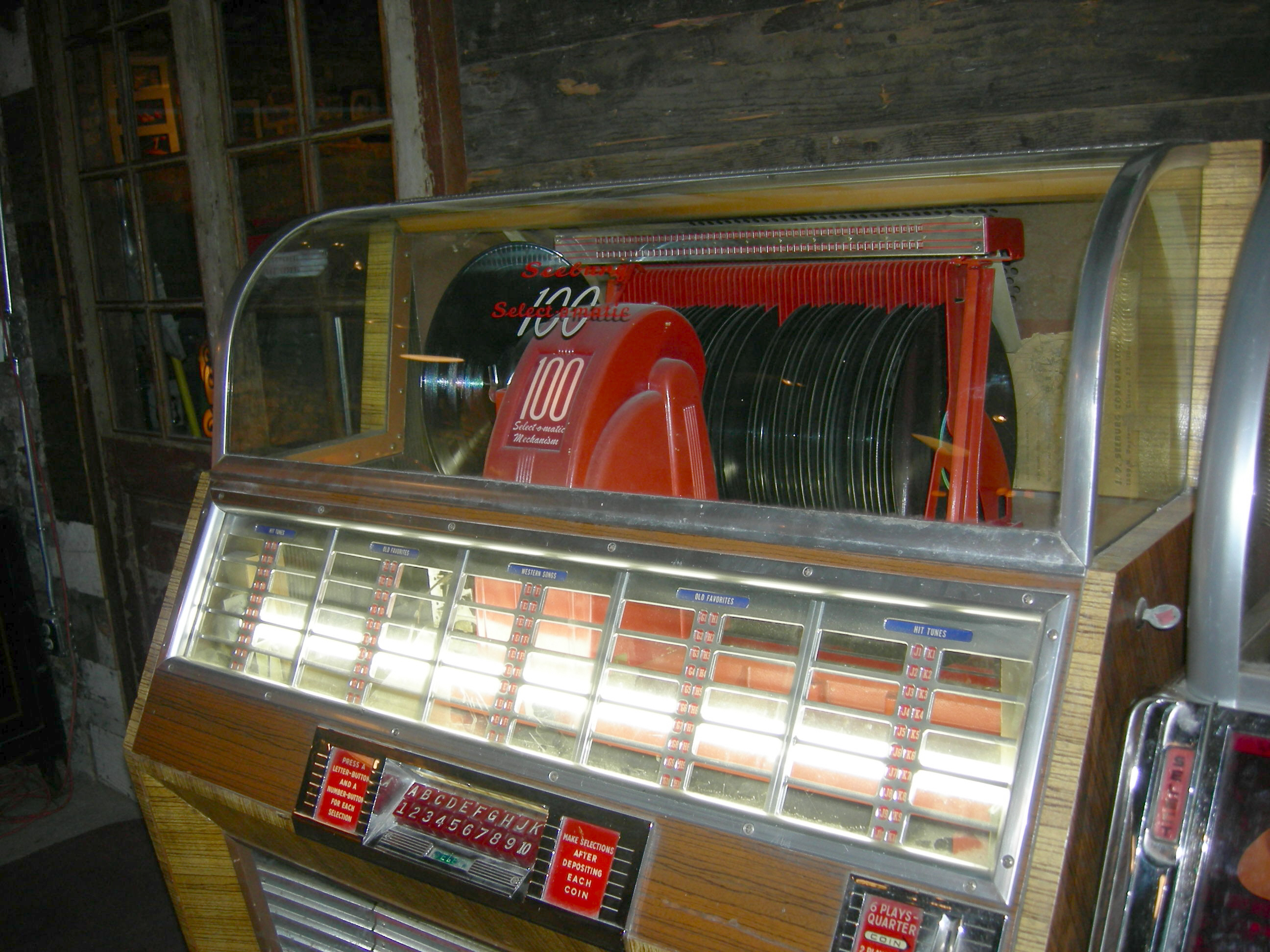
Seeburg Select-O-Matic M100A jukebox, which handles 50 78rpm records (1949)

In the early days of the jukebox, the 78 rpm record was standard and until the 1940s, only 10 to 24 selections could be played on one machine.

The small number of selections changed with Seeburg’s introduction of the “Select-O-Matic” mechanism in the 1949 model M100A, which could play both sides of 50 records for a total of 100 selections. In 1950, Seeburg introduced the first commercial jukebox designed to play the then-new 45 rpm records. They increased the number of records from 50 to 100 in 1955, eventually settling on 50 or 80 per machine after 1958.

The Seeburg "Select-O-Matic" mechanism stores the records in a linear magazine and plays them vertically clamped to a flywheel turntable. The selected record is pushed forward from behind, then clamped in place. The tonearm is likewise oriented vertically and has a stylus on each side. The tonearm assembly shifts right or left depending on which side of the record is being played. In machines manufactured during the 1950s, the entire mechanism was visible to the user. Later machines concealed the mechanism in favor of graphics and lights, but internally they contained the same mechanism.

Seeburg started diversifying its product lines in 1959 with the introduction of background music players such as the Seeburg 1000, which used special 9-inch (230 mm), 16 2/3 rpm records. Seeburg acquired Williams (pinball and other games) and Gulbransen (electronic organs and drum machines) in 1964 and the H. N. White Company (King brass and woodwind instruments) in 1965. Gulbransen remained in production through the late 1960s, with limited production (mostly drum machines) revived during the 1970s.

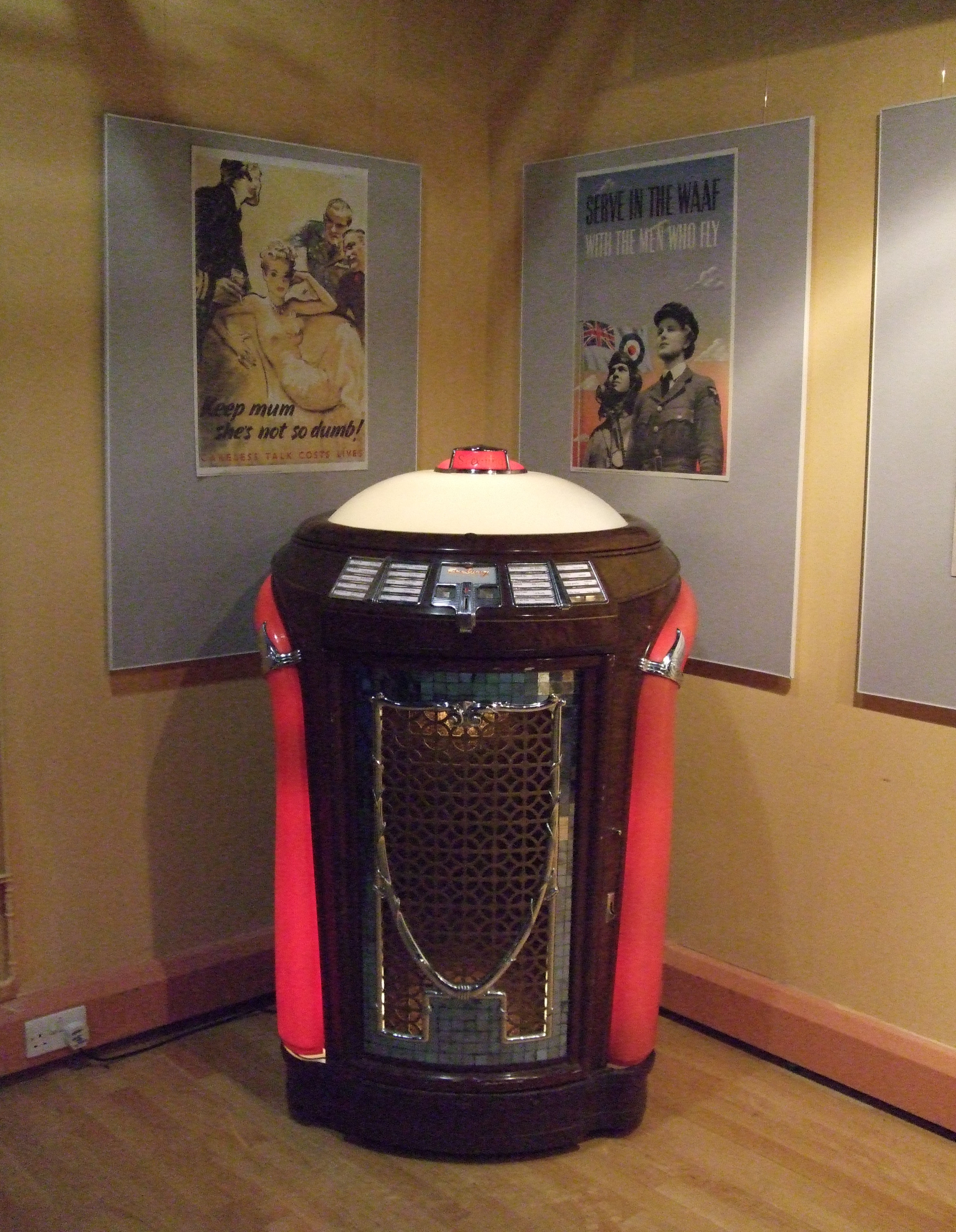
Seeburg "Trashcan" jukebox (1948, Symphonola Model 148)

In 1965, the Seeburg Corporation announced that it was establishing a new music performance rights organization to compete with ASCAP, BMI, and SESAC. The society was called Coin-Operated Phonograph Performance Society (COPPS). The plan was for Seeburg to make recordings solely for play in jukeboxes.

During the 1970s Seeburg was faced with debt and a declining market for their music products. The corporation headed into bankruptcy in 1979 and was broken up in 1980. In Seeburg's reorganization effort, jukebox production came under the "Seeburg Phonograph Division," which the court closed in September 1979. Following the demise of Seeburg Phonograph Division, ownership of Seeburg's assets passed to their creditors and liquidation of the company began. The production assets were sold to Stern Electronics, who began producing "Stern/Seeburg" jukeboxes. The parts department stock was purchased by Los Angeles-based Jukeboxes Unlimited in September 1980.

In March 1984, former Seeburg employees and a group of investors formed "The Seeburg Phonograph Company" and acquired its production assets from Stern, which was going out of business. It became the first manufacturer to produce a CD jukebox. It remained in operation for a few years and several models of CD jukeboxes were made during that period. Eventually, the company closed and now nothing remains. The Seeburg name lived again on Wurlitzer 1015 reproduction CD jukeboxes produced in Mexico for a short time. As of February 2010, a touchscreen digital jukebox conversion kit bearing the Seeburg name was being offered under the name Seeburg Digital. Seeburg Digital was a division of Penbrook Amusements located in Harrisburg, Pennsylvania.

As of 2026, the Seeburg 1000 website continually livestreams the best of the Seeburg 1000 Background Music Library recordings.

== See also ==
Seeburg / Gulbransen
rhythm machines

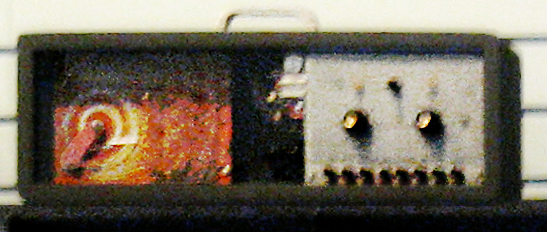
Rhythm Prince (interior exposed)

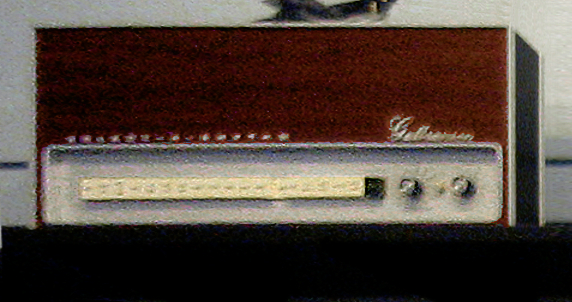
Select-A-Rhythm (fully electronic)

Products

- Orchestrion
- Jukebox
- Drum machine (collaboration with Gulbransen home organ in 1960s)

Related companies

- Gulbransen (a home organ manufacturer that released first transistor organ and earliest transistor rhythm machine; acquired by Seeburg in 1964, production ended 1969)
- Williams Electronics (owned by Seeburg 1964–1980)
- Kay Musical Instrument Company (once owned by Seeburg 1965–1967)
- King Musical Instruments (owned by Seeburg 1965–1980)
- Stern Electronics (acquired Seeburg facilities in 1980 to produce "Stern-Seeburg" jukeboxes; out of business 1985)
- Seeburg Phonograph Company (founded 1984, acquired Stern facilities and produced CD jukeboxes, 1980s - 1990s)

Notable concurrents, rivals

- MUZAK - a background music provider, Seeburg 1000's rival.
