= Clayton State University =

Public university in Morrow, Georgia, US

- Former names: Clayton Junior College (1969–1986); Clayton State College (1986–1996); Clayton College and State University (1996–2005)
- Motto: Dreams. Made Real.
- Type: Public university
- Established: 1969; 57 years ago
- Parent institution: University System of Georgia
- President: Dr. Georj L. Lewis (President)
- Faculty: 208
- Administrative staff: 356
- Students: 6,406 (fall 2025)
- Undergraduates: 5,726 (fall 2025)
- Postgraduates: 644 (fall 2025)
- Location: Morrow, Georgia, U.S. 33°35′40″N 84°19′42″W
- Colors: Laker blue, Georgia clay
- Nickname: Lakers
- Sporting affiliations: NCAA Division II
- Website: clayton.edu

Clayton State University is a public university in Clayton County, Georgia, United States, with large portions being in the Morrow city limits. It serves Metro Atlanta and is part of the University System of Georgia.

The main campus includes 192 acres (0.78 km^{2}) of wooded grounds and five lakes. Located in the north-central part of Clayton County in suburban south metro Atlanta, the main campus is about twenty minutes from downtown Atlanta. Clayton State also maintains a separate Fayette County instructional site in Peachtree City and offers additional instruction at locations in Jonesboro in Clayton County and McDonough in Henry County.

Upon opening in 1991, Clayton State's Spivey Hall began presenting jazz, classical music and other musical entertainment. It has since developed into one of the premiere chamber music venues in the Atlanta metropolitan area and offers more than 400 performances per year. These performances air frequently on Georgia Public Broadcasting.

Clayton State basketball, soccer, cross-country, tennis, golf, and track & field programs are a part of Division II of the National Collegiate Athletic Association (NCAA), competing in the Peach Belt Conference (PBC). In 2011, the Clayton State women's basketball team won the NCAA Division II national championship.

== History ==
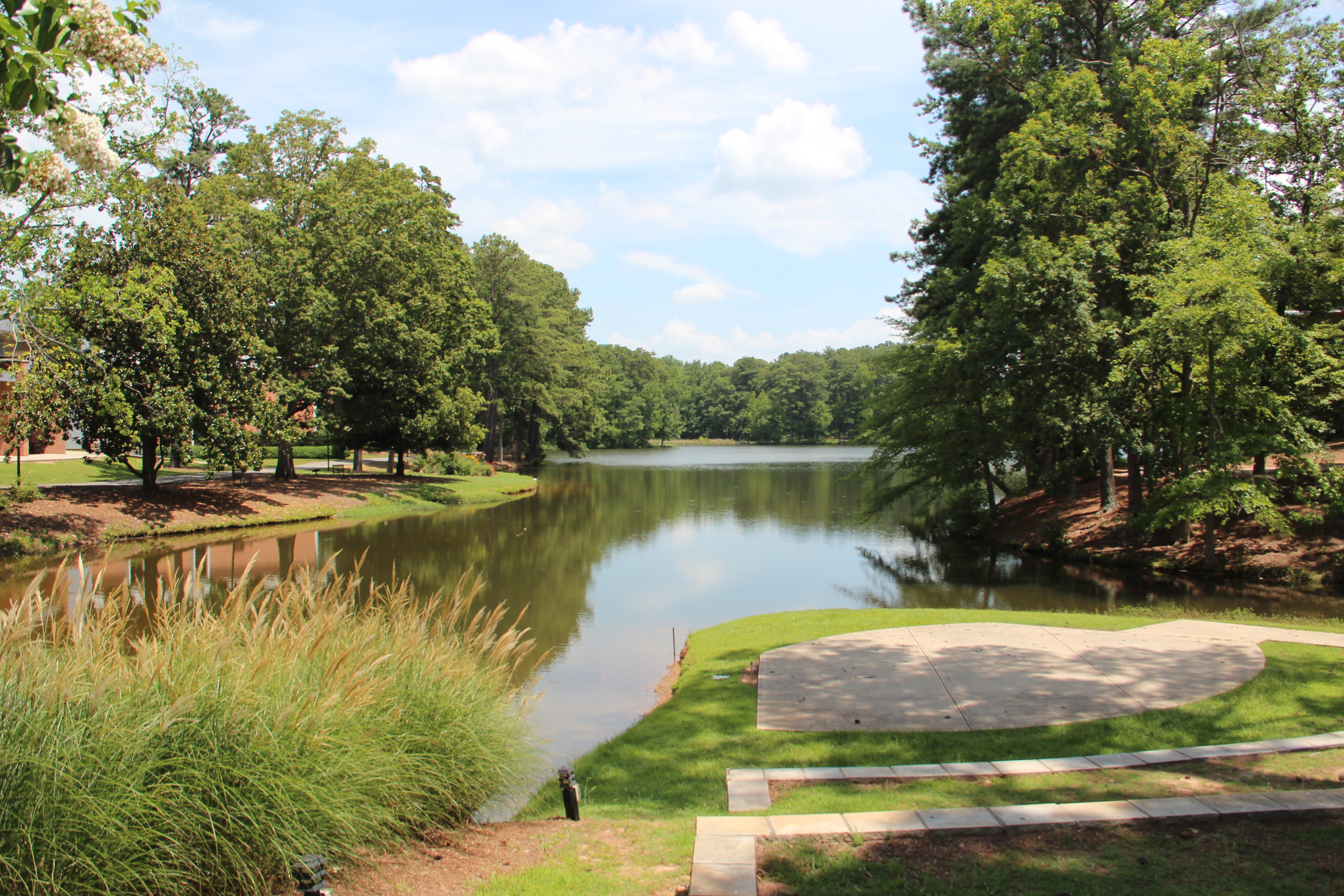
The Judge Eugene Lawson Amphitheater overlooking Swan Lake.

The institution was founded in 1969 and was originally known as Clayton Junior College. When the school became a four-year institution in 1986, the institute took on the name Clayton State College. In 1996, the Georgia Board of Regents renamed many higher-education institutions, with Clayton State becoming Clayton College and State University. In 2005, the name was changed to Clayton State University. Clayton State University is accredited by the Southern Association of Colleges and Schools Commission on Colleges to award associate, baccalaureate, and master's degrees.

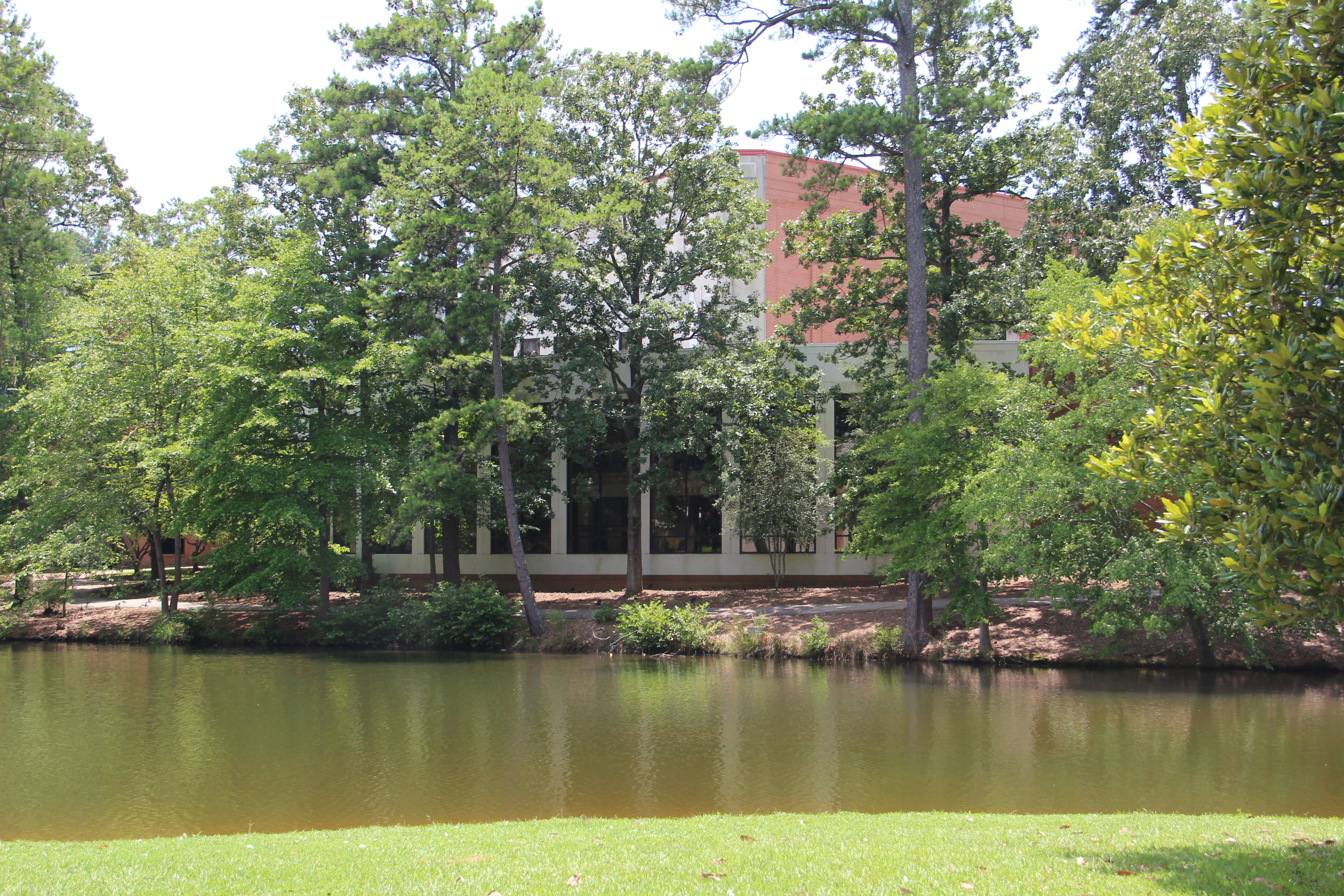
Spivey Hall.

Clayton State University is organized into four colleges and one school:

- College of Arts and Sciences
- College of Business
- College of Health
- College of Information and Mathematical Sciences
- School of Graduate Studies

The College of Business is accredited by the Association to Advance Collegiate Schools of Business; only the top 5% of all business schools worldwide are AACSB accredited. The Harry S. Downs Continuing Education Center, overlooking the main campus lake, offers programs in language, personal growth, and technical subjects, and is also a venue for conferences and special events.

In 2016 the Clinical/Counseling Psychology master's degree program gained Masters in Psychology and Counseling Accreditation Council (MPCAC) accreditation through 2026.

In 2004, approval for developing a masters program was given by the Georgia Board of Regents. Clayton State University currently offers nine master's degree programs and 40 baccalaureate degree majors.

In 2021, Dr. T. Ramon Stuart became Clayton State's first African-American president.

The university is accredited by the Southern Association of Colleges and Schools.

== Campus ==
The university is in Clayton County, with portions to the east in unincorporated areas. Large portions of the grounds to the west are in the Morrow city limits. A portion of the university property is in Lake City. The United States Postal Service uses the city name "Morrow, GA" with the postal address.

== Student body ==
Undergraduate demographics as of Fall 2023
Race and ethnicity	Total
Black	65%
Hispanic	12%
White	10%
Asian	5%
Two or more races	3%
Unknown	3%
International student	1%
Economic diversity
Low-income (Note: The percentage of students who received an income-based federal Pell grant intended for low-income students.)	61%
Affluent (Note: The percentage of students who are a part of the American middle class at the bare minimum.)	39%

The vast majority of Clayton State students come from the Atlanta metro area. The remaining few come from other regions of Georgia, the United States, and some 40 foreign countries.

While one-third of the students are under 22, the median age is 28 and the university is recognized for two-thirds of its students being non-traditional, adult learners.

The U.S. News & World Report ranking of colleges consistently identifies Clayton State University as having one of the most diverse student body populations among comprehensive baccalaureate-level colleges and universities in the southern United States. More than 80% of the student body self-identify as an ethnic or racial minority (majority African-American).

All students are required to own or have access to a laptop computer, regardless of major or status.

There are over 45 student organizations established on campus.

Clayton State's Greek system consists of three National Pan-Hellenic Council (NPHC) fraternities, four NPHC sororities, and Alpha Kappa Lambda. There is no traditional Greek housing on or near campus. Less than five percent of the undergraduate student body are active in the Greek system.

== Athletics ==
Clayton State University is a Division II member of the National Collegiate Athletic Association (NCAA), competing in the Peach Belt Conference (PBC). The university fields varsity teams, known as the Lakers, in five men's and five women's sports: men's and women's basketball, men's and women's cross country, men's golf, men's and women's soccer, women's tennis, and men's and women's indoor and outdoor track and field.
