= Gulbransen =

Gulbrasen Piano Company

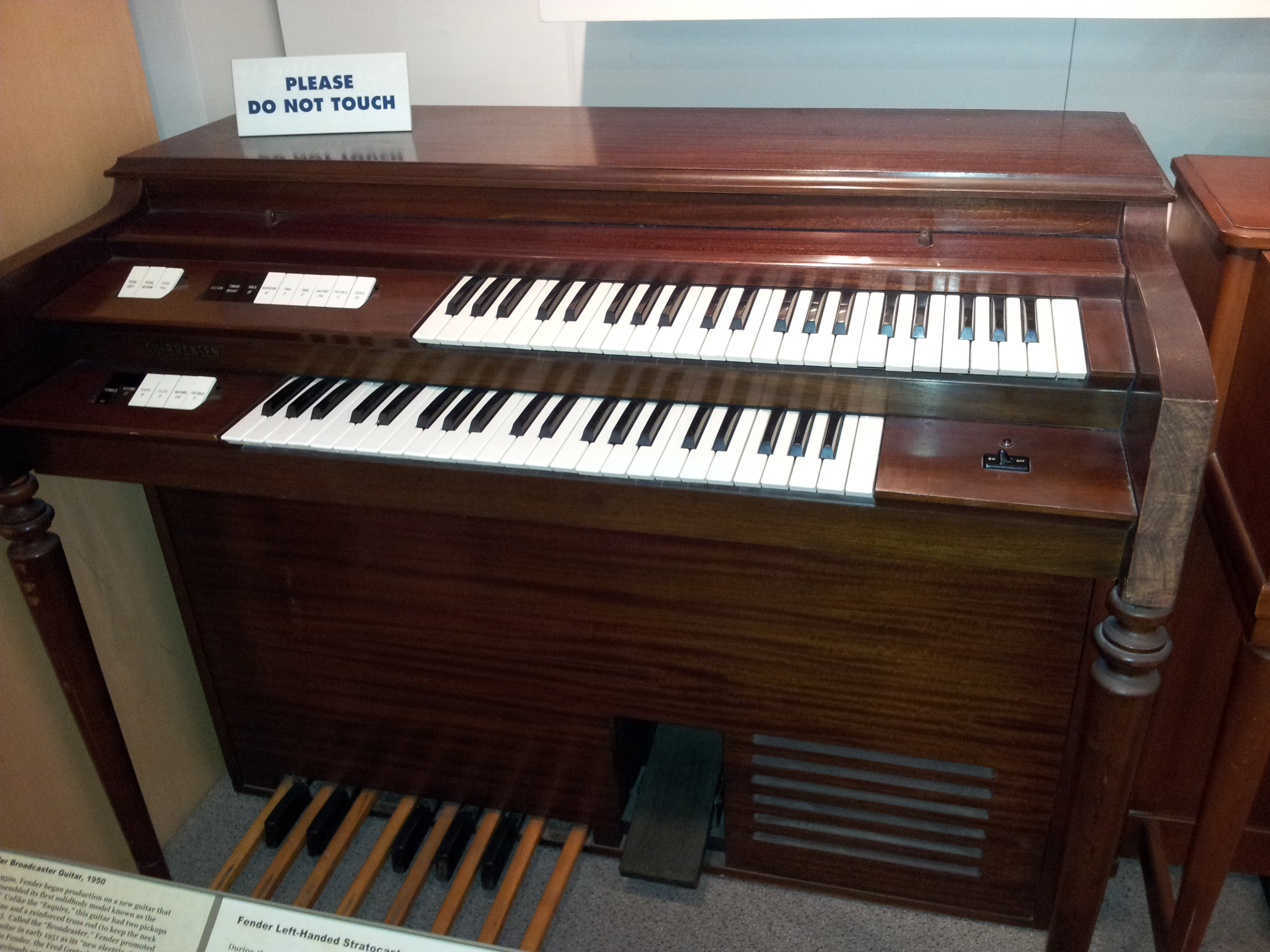
Gulbransen Organ
exhibited at Museum of Making Music

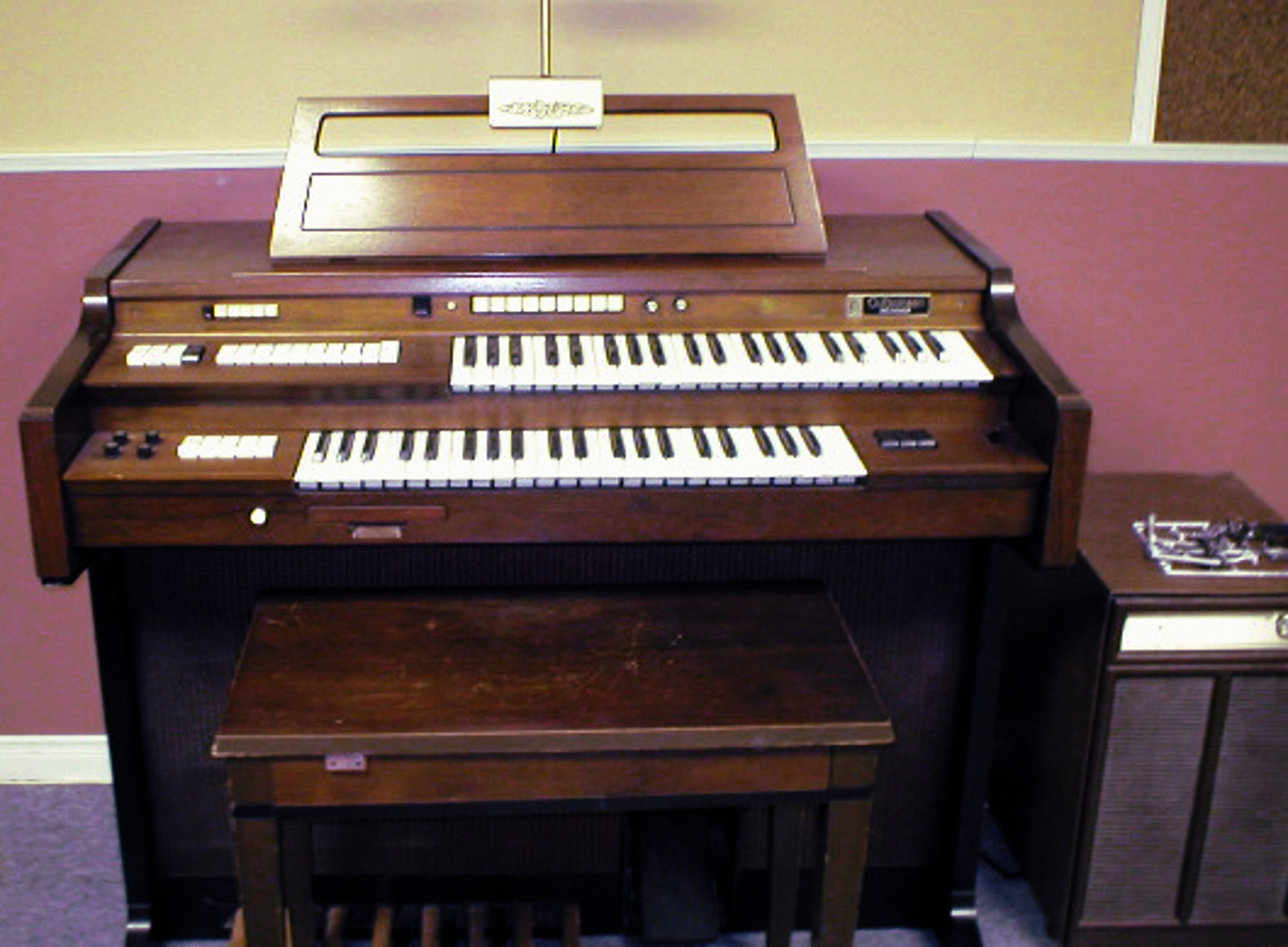
Gulbransen Pacemaker
electronic home organ

Gulbransen Company was an American manufacturer of pianos, including player pianos; and reed and home organs in Chicago, Illinois. Established in 1904 by Axel Gulbransen as Gulbransen Piano Company, it introduced several innovations in the field.

Gulbransen introduced several innovations. In its early years, Gulbransen made the first upright piano with a player piano mechanism in the same case. In the 1920s, thousands of player pianos were manufactured by the firm under the Gulbransen and Dickinson name. In the electronic organ era, Gulbransen pioneered several innovations in the production of home electronic organs that became industry standards:

- Use of transistor circuitry
- Built-in Leslie speaker system
- Chime stop and piano stop
- "Automatic Rhythm" (built-in drum machine)
- "Automatic Walking Bass" (bass accompaniment)

In 1957, Gulbransen released the first transistorized electric organ: "Gulbransen Model B" (Model 1100), Its use of transistors was limited to the tone generators; the power amplifier was driven by vacuum tubes. (The first fully transistorized organ for churches was later built by Rodgers Instruments.)

Seeburg / Gulbransen
rhythm machines

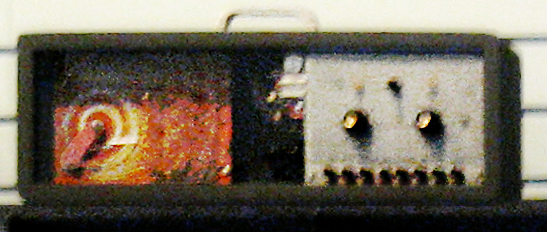
Seeburg Rhythm Prince (uses mechatronic wheel sequencer)

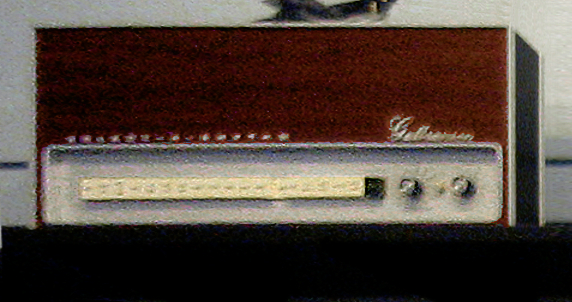
Seeburg/Gulbransen Select-A-Rhythm (fully electronic)

In the 1960s, Gulbransen and Seeburg Corporation released one of the earliest transistorized rhythm machines: "Seeburg/Gulbransen Select-A-Rhythm". Seeburg would invent a fully transistorized rhythm machine in 1964 and receive a patent three years later.

Around 1950, the company was sold to CBS. In 1964, it merged with Seeburg Corporation. Production ceased in 1969.

In 1979, Seeburg filed for bankruptcy, which later sold the brand to Mission Bay Investments in 1985 and produced Elka organs under the Gulbransen name. In 2002 or 2003, QRS Music Technologies acquired the brand; pianos were made by Samick.

== See also ==
- Electronic organ
- Drum machine
- Seeburg Corporation
