= Omega Christian television =

Icelandic Christian television station

Omega Christian Television is a Christian television station founded by Eiríkur Sigurbjörnsson (A.K.A. Erik Erikson) which started broadcasting on 28 July 1992. Initially it only broadcast in Iceland but it has since expanded its coverage to a large part of Europe. It broadcasts in the United Kingdom on Sky as The Gospel Channel. The programmes include well-known evangelical preachers and self acclaimed faith healers such as Peter Popoff and Benny Hinn.

== Trinity Broadcasting Network ==
By 1994, Trinity Broadcasting Network had partnered with Omega Christian Television boosting the 10-watt station to 1000-watts "overnight."
