= Maestrovox =

Maestrovox was a British company best known for its line of electron valve based electronic organs. They were designed and built by Victor Harold Ward. The first design model went on sale on 5 May 1952 at the British Industries Fair at Olympia, London, where it was hailed as the "Success of the Year" taking orders in excess of £80,000. Currently, only 24 are still known to exist.
