= Johannus =

Dutch builder of electronic organs

Johannus Orgelbouw
- Founded: 1968
- Founder: Johannes (Hans) Versteegt
- Headquarters: Keplerlaan 2, 6716 BS Ede, Gelderland, Netherlands
- Key people: René van de Weerd; Marco van de Weerd
- Products: classical church organs (digital and pipes, also combined)
- Owner: Vandeweerd
- Parent: Global Organ Group
- Website: Johannus Orgelbouw

Johannus Orgelbouw is a Dutch builder of electronic organs for home and church use, located in Ede, Netherlands. The organ manufacturer was founded in 1968 by Johannes (Hans) Versteegt (1928–2011), who had previously designed electronic organs for Eminent and Viscount. The Johannus prototypes were developed in the facility at Prins Hendriklaan in Ede.

== History ==
In 1971 the factory started production at Tuinstraat in Veenendaal and the Johannus organs were introduced at the Firato exhibition in Amsterdam. From there, Johannus organs went all over Europe.

In 1976 a new factory was built at Morsestraat 28 in Ede. The factory had an auditorium named after famous Dutch organist Feike Asma (1912–1984). Hans expanded the company’s export activities to the USA, Canada, South Africa, Australia, and other countries.

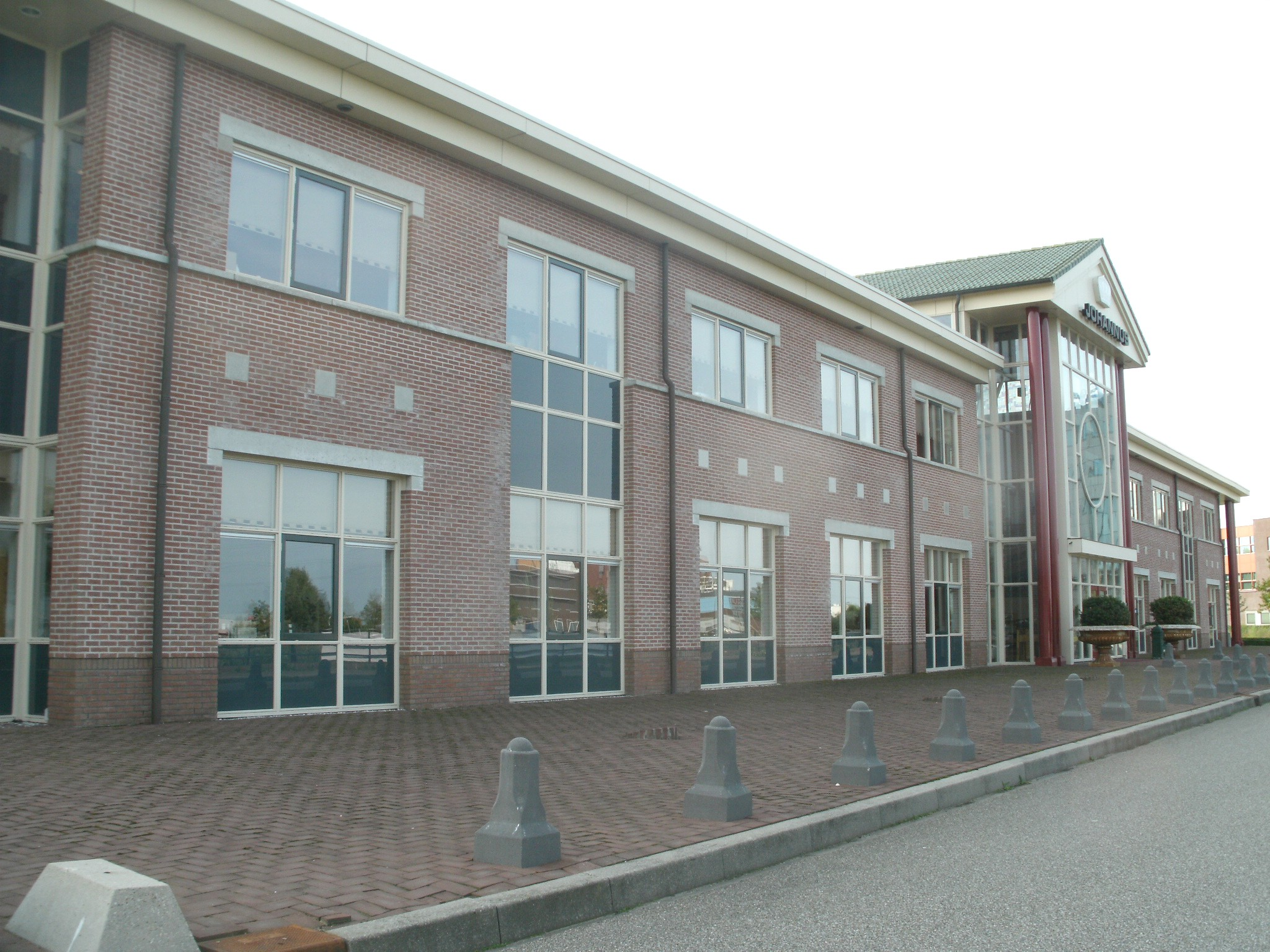
The Johannus factory in Ede, Netherlands

In 1985, Hans Versteegt retired from the company he founded. In 1987, Gert van de Weerd acquired Johannus, introducing real-time sampling in digital organ technology, and increased organ sales in many countries. In 2002, a new headquarters and production facility was inaugurated at Keplerlaan 2 in Ede. Built in late 19th-century style, the new headquarters has a concert hall that seats 330.

In 2009, Gert van de Weerd retired and handed Johannus over to his two sons, Marco van de Weerd (Marketing & Sales) and René van de Weerd (Research & Development) and by 2014, Johannus products were exported to more than 100 countries worldwide. In January 2016, the van de Weerds acquired Rodgers Instruments, an American organ manufacturer. In addition to Johannus and Rodgers, they also own the Makin and Copeman Hart organ brands.

=== Technology ===
1968–1979: Diode keying, analog technology

1980–1986: TMS, integrated circuit, analog technology

1987–1994: M114 digital 8-bit converter, real-time sampling technology

1995–1996: T9500 digital 18-bit converter, introducing Romantic and Baroque sample sets

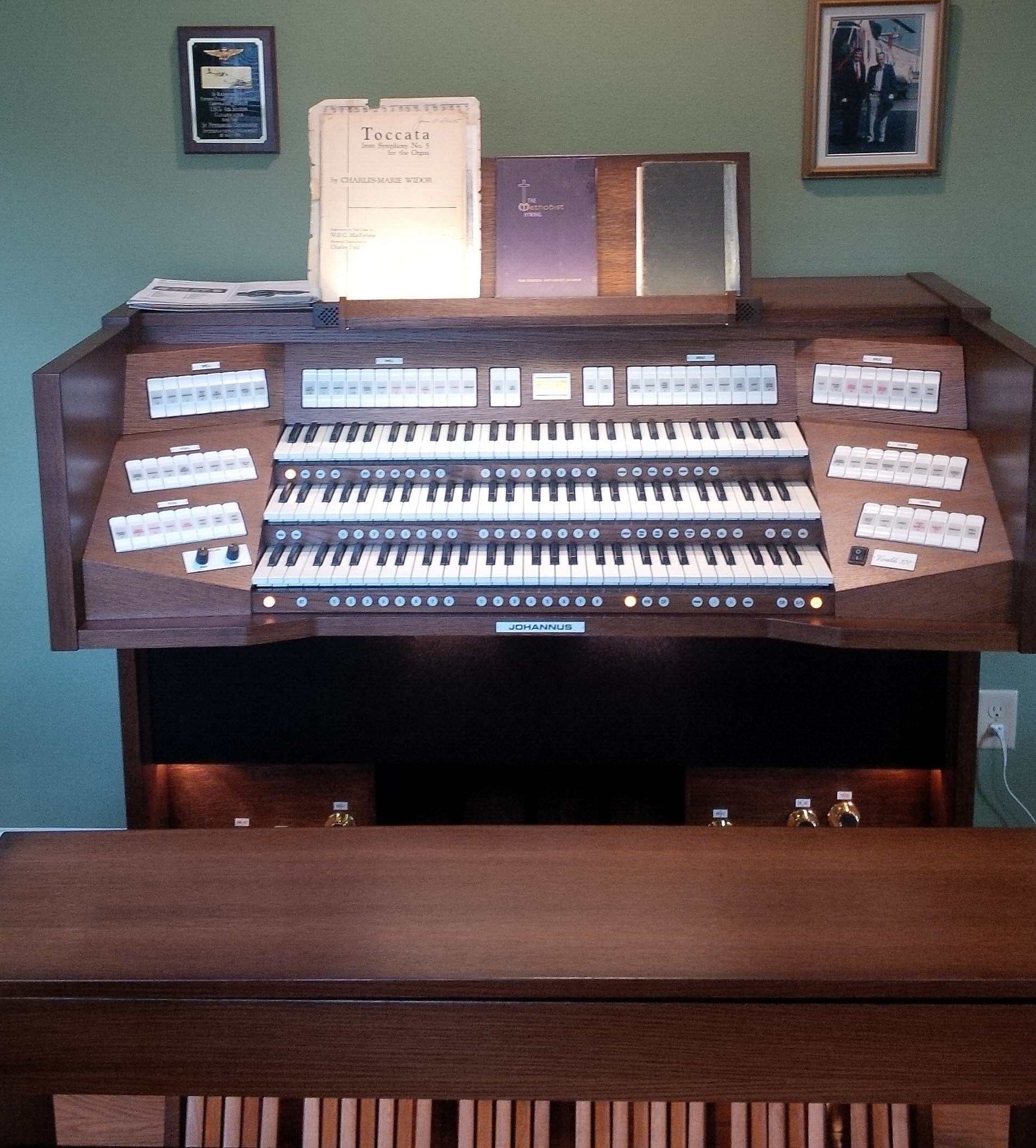
Johannus Vivaldi 370 model, having 73 ranks with T9000 processor, built in 2015

1997–2001: T9700 digital 20-bit converter, I2C technology

2002–2010: T8000 digital 24-bit converter, introducing 3 sets of sample banks

2011–today: T9000 digital 24-bit converter, introducing 4 sets of sample banks

2012–today: OranjeCore technology

2016–today: Direct Streaming technology

== Company artists ==
- Feike Asma (1912–1984)
- Klaas Jan Mulder (1930–2008)
- André van Vliet (1969-2026)
