= Oxygene =

Oxygene or Oxygène may refer to:

== Music by Jean-Michel Jarre ==
- Oxygène, a 1976 album
  - "Oxygène (Part IV)", a single from the album
  - Oxygène: New Master Recording (2007), a new recording of the album
- Oxygène 7–13, a 1997 album
- Oxygène 3, a 2016 album

== Other uses ==
- Oxygene (programming language)
- "Oxygène", a song by C418 from Minecraft – Volume Alpha
- Oxygen (2021 film), a French film
- SNCF Oxygène, a French high speed train

== See also ==
- Oxygen (disambiguation)
