= Oxygen (disambiguation) =

Oxygen is a chemical element with symbol O and atomic number 8.

Oxygen may also refer to:

== Computing ==
- Oxygen XML Editor
- Oxygen Project, a theme set for KDE Plasma Workspaces
- OxygenOS, an Android-based OS for OnePlus smartphones

== Film and television ==
- Oxygen (1999 film), an American crime thriller by Richard Shepard
- Oxygen (2009 film), a Russian drama film
- Oxygen (2010 film), a Belgian-Dutch film
- Oxygen (2017 film), an Indian Telugu action film
- Oxygen (2020 film), a Bangladeshi short film
- Oxygen (2021 film), a French-language science fiction film
- Oxygen (TV network), an American television network
- "Oxygen" (Doctor Who), a television episode

== Literature ==
- Oxygen (Miller novel), a 2001 novel by Andrew Miller
- Oxygen (Olson and Ingermanson novel), a 2001 novel by John B. Olson and Randall S. Ingermanson
- Oxygen (play), a 2001 play by Carl Djerassi and Roald Hoffmann
- Oxygen (magazine), a women's magazine published by Outside Inc.

== Music ==
- Oxygen Music Works, an Anglo-American record label

=== Albums ===
- Oxygen (Avalon album), 2001
- Oxygen (Baptiste Giabiconi album) or the title song, 2012
- Oxygen (Lincoln Brewster album) or the title song, 2014
- Oxygen (Varga album), 1996
- Oxygen (Wild Orchid album), 1998
- Oxygen: Inhale, by Thousand Foot Krutch, or the title song, 2014
- Oxygen (Swans EP) or the title song, 2014
- Oxygen, an EP by Austin Mahone, 2018

=== Songs ===
- "Oxygen" (Hadouken! song), 2010
- "Oxygen" (Marie Serneholt song), 2006
- "Oxygen" (Winona Oak and Robin Schulz song), 2020
- "Oxygen", by Beach Bunny from Emotional Creature, 2022
- "Oxygen", by Bryan Adams from 11, 2008
- "Oxygen", by Catfish and the Bottlemen from The Ride, 2016
- "Oxygen", by Colbie Caillat from Coco, 2007
- "Oxygen", by Crown the Empire from Retrograde, 2016
- "Oxygen", by Dirty Heads from Dirty Heads, 2016
- "Oxygen", by Elaine Paige from Love Can Do That, 1991
- "Oxygen", by Feeder from Echo Park, 2001
- "Oxygen", by Hoku from Hoku, 2000
- "Oxygen", by Jesse McCartney from Departure, 2008
- "Oxygen", by JJ72 from JJ72, 2000
- "Oxygen", by Kara from Move Again, 2022
- "Oxygen", by Maia Mitchell from the Teen Beach Movie soundtrack, 2013
- "Oxygen", by New Found Glory from Coming Home, 2006
- "Oxygen", by Oh, Sleeper from Bloodied / Unbowed, 2019
- "Oxygen", by Opshop from You Are Here, 2004
- "Oxygen", by Soul Asylum from The Silver Lining, 2006
- "Oxygen", by Spice Girls from Forever, 2000
- "Oxygen", by Steffany Gretzinger from Blackout, 2018
- "Oxygen", by Swans from To Be Kind, 2014
- "Oxygen", by Twelve Foot Ninja from Outlier, 2016
- "Oxygen", by Twice from More & More, 2020
- "Oxygen", by Willy Mason from Where the Humans Eat, 2004
- "Oxygen", by Zion I from Break a Dawn, 2006

== Other uses ==
- Bottled oxygen (climbing), oxygen use in mountaineering
- Dark oxygen, oxygen produced without photosynthesis
- Dioxygen (O_{2}), an allotrope of oxygen
- Oxygen (building), an office building in Szczecin, Poland
- Oxygen (horse) (1828–1854/1855), a British Thoroughbred racehorse
- Oxygen Park, a public park in Education City, Doha, Qatar
- Oxygen SpA, an Italian electric scooter company
- Oxygen Square, urban square in Chittagong, Bangladesh
- Oxygen Towers, residential towers in Manchester, England

== See also ==
- Oxegen, a 2004–2011 music festival in Ireland
- Oxygene (disambiguation)
- O (disambiguation)
