= Oxygène (Part IV) =

- German cover, 1977

Single by Jean-Michel Jarre

from the album Oxygène
- B-side: "Oxygène (Part VI)"
- Released: January 1977
- Recorded: 1976
- Studio: Jean-Michel Jarre's home studio, Paris
- Genre: Electronic; ambient; synth-pop; new wave
- Length: 3:30; 4:14 (Album)
- Label: Disques Motors/Polydor
- Songwriter: Jean-Michel Jarre
- Producer: Jean-Michel Jarre

Jean-Michel Jarre singles chronology
"Oxygène (Part IV)" (1977)	"Oxygène (Part II)" (1977)

Music videos
- "Oxygene, Pt. 4" (original version) on YouTube
- "Oxygene, Pt. 4" (1989 version) on YouTube

"Oxygène (Part IV)" (released in some countries under the title "Oxygène IV") is a 1977 single composed by the French electronic musician and composer Jean-Michel Jarre, from his third studio album Oxygène (1976). It is Jarre's most successful single, reaching number four on the UK Singles Chart and peaking in the top ten in the charts of several European countries. It also was used in the 2008 video game Grand Theft Auto IV, and in the BBC drama Micro Men.

== Background ==
In 1974 Jarre composed the opening jingle for the A4 autoroute—also known as autoroute de l'Est—in Paris. Some media such as The Telegraph pointed out the rumors of the possible original incarnation of "Oxygène (Part IV)" in the jingle.

== Composition and recording ==
Like the rest of the Oxygène album, "Oxygène (Part IV)" was recorded in the makeshift studio in Jarre's kitchen in his Paris apartment, using several instruments such as the RMI Harmonic Synthesizer. "Oxygène (Part IV)" begins with a sound that evokes the wind, a flat noise generated by an English synthesizer called EMS VCS 3, the first synthesizer that Jarre had.

In the middle of this white noise, Jarre superimposes different musical sequences, among them are two presets "rock" and "slow rock" played simultaneously by using sellotape to hold down multiple selections on a Korg Mini-Pops 7 drum machine. He also added filtering effects to the drum sounds "in a very subtle way to give life inside the patterns." The "ethereal string sounds" were created by running the VCS 3 and Eminent 310 Unique through an Electro Harmonix Small Stone phase pedal for guitars. French sound engineer, Michel Geiss programmed in the ARP 2600 the main sound of "Oxygène (Part IV)". Jarre also used a Revox tape to create delay on some sounds.

The piece is composed in Dorian mode.

== Release and critical reception ==
Following the release of the song in France, the single was released in Belgium and the Netherlands during the spring of 1977 with equal success. On its release in the United Kingdom on 19 August 1977, "Oxygène (Part IV)" started picking up airplay on BBC Radio 1, the country's only national pop music station at the time, reaching number four on the UK charts during September. The radio station also played the entire Oxygène album. In France, Europe 1 used it as the theme of two of its regular programs, Hit Parade directed by Jean-Loup Lafont, and basketball show Basket sur Europe 1 in the credit titles.

Robin Smith of Record Mirror called the track "a classic amongst singles" and an "infectious tune for which I hope you won't find a cure". "Oxygène (Part IV)" reached number four on the UK Singles Chart and reached the top ten in several other countries across Europe and in New Zealand.

In 1989, it was remixed and re-released, with a music video which features a penguin march on Antarctica.

== Legacy ==
The song was chosen as fifth greatest synth sound of all time by English magazine Computer Music. The British newspaper The Guardian called it the best of his oeuvre and described it as "an instantly recognisable hook that rides on a bossa nova beat to explore the galaxies". Treble considered it one of the most essential synth pop songs in history. In Mojo, Phil Alexander noted "the composer's pop sensibilites evident on 'Oxygene Part IV'".

== Charts ==
=== Weekly charts ===
Chart (1977–1978)	Peak position
Australia (Kent Music Report)	26
Belgium (Ultratop 50 Flanders)	3
Belgium (Ultratop 50 Wallonia)	1
Germany (GfK)	16
Ireland (IRMA)	7
Netherlands (Dutch Top 40)	4
Netherlands (Single Top 100)	3
New Zealand (Recorded Music NZ)	6
Norway (VG-lista)	9
Spain (AFE)	1
Sweden (Sverigetopplistan)	9
UK Singles (Official Charts)	4
Chart (1989)	Peak position
UK Singles (Official Charts)	65

=== Year-end charts ===
Chart (1977)	Rank
Dutch Charts (MegaCharts)	71
UK Singles Chart (BMRB)	38

== Bibliography ==
- Duguay, Michael (2018), Jean Michel Jarre, Books on Demand, ISBN 978-284-993-324-4
