= Avant-pop =

Experimental genre of popular music

Avant-pop is popular music that is experimental, new, and distinct from previous styles while retaining an immediate accessibility for the listener. The term implies a combination of avant-garde sensibilities with existing elements from popular music in the service of novel or idiosyncratic artistic visions.

== Definition ==
"Avant-pop" has been used to label music which balances experimental or avant-garde approaches with stylistic elements from popular music, and which probes mainstream conventions of structure or form. Writer Tejumola Olaniyan describes "avant-pop music" as transgressing "the boundaries of established styles, the meanings those styles reference, and the social norms they support or imply." Music writer Sean Albiez describes "avant-pop" as identifying idiosyncratic artists working in "a liminal space between contemporary classical music and the many popular music genres that developed in the second half of the twentieth century." He noted avant-pop's basis in experimentalism, as well its postmodern and non-hierarchical incorporation of varied genres such as pop, electronica, rock, classical, and jazz.

Paul Grimstad of The Brooklyn Rail writes that avant-pop is music that "re-sequences" the elements of song structure "so that (a) none of the charm of the tune is lost, but (b) this very accessibility leads one to bump into weirder elements welded into the design." The Tribeca New Music Festival defines "avant-pop" as "music that draws its energy from both popular music and classical forms." The term has elsewhere been used by literary critic Larry McCaffery to describe "the most radical, subversive literary talents of the postmodern new wave."

== History ==
In the 1960s, as popular music began to gain cultural importance and question its status as commercial entertainment, musicians began to look to the post-war avant-garde for inspiration. In 1959, music producer Joe Meek recorded I Hear a New World (1960), which Tiny Mix Tapes' Jonathan Patrick calls a "seminal moment in both electronic music and avant-pop history [...] a collection of dreamy pop vignettes, adorned with dubby echoes and tape-warped sonic tendrils" which would be largely ignored at the time. Other early avant-pop productions included the Beatles's 1966 song "Tomorrow Never Knows", which incorporated techniques from musique concrète, avant-garde composition, Indian music, and electro-acoustic sound manipulation into a 3-minute pop format, and the Velvet Underground's integration of La Monte Young's minimalist and drone music ideas, beat poetry, and 1960s pop art.

In late 1960s Germany, an experimental avant-pop scene dubbed "krautrock" saw influential artists such as Kraftwerk, Can, and Tangerine Dream draw inspiration from minimalism, German academic music, and Anglo-American pop-rock. According to The Quietus' David McNamee, the 1968 album An Electric Storm, recorded by the electronic music group White Noise (featuring members from the U.K.’s BBC Radiophonic Workshop), is an "undisputed masterpiece of early avant-pop". In the 1970s, progressive rock and post-punk music would see new avant-pop fusions, including the work of Pink Floyd, Genesis, Henry Cow, This Heat, and the Pop Group. The "avant-pop cult favorites" Slapp Happy formed in 1972, drawing variously on styles like chanson, cabaret, bossa nova, and tango while collaborating with Henry Cow. More contemporary avant-pop artists have included David Sylvian, Scott Walker, and Björk, whose vocal experimentation and innovative modes of expression have seen them move beyond norms of commercial pop music.

Others who have been credited as avant-pop's pioneers include the Velvet Underground's Lou Reed, singer Kate Bush, performance artist Laurie Anderson, art pop musician Spookey Ruben, and Black Dice's Eric Copeland. As of 2017, contemporary artists working in avant-pop areas include Julia Holter, Holly Herndon and Oneohtrix Point Never.

In 1979, Andrew Stiller of The Buffalo News wrote of two separate strands; "avant-garde pop", he theorised, comprised new wave music and acts like Brian Eno, Devo and Talking Heads, whereas "pop avant-garde", he deemed, was "a popularization of the indeterminacy cum electronics so widespread among classical composers a decade ago". He counted recent works by Vangelis, Heldon and Bruce Ditmas as examples of the latter, and wrote that it originated in the 1960s counterculture's "notions of universal amateurism" with pieces like the Doors' "Horse Latitudes" (1967), the Beatles' "Revolution 9" (1968) and, later, the solo improvisations of Terry Riley.

== See also ==
- Art pop
- Outsider music
- Progressive pop
- Avant-funk
- Underground music
