= Oxygène: New Master Recording =

Studio album by Jean-Michel Jarre
- Released: 26 November 2007 France; 11 December 2007 Worldwide
- Recorded: 2007
- Length: 40:10
- Label: EMI
- Producer: Jean-Michel Jarre

Jean-Michel Jarre chronology
Téo & Téa (2007)	Oxygène: New Master Recording (2007)	Essentials & Rarities (2011)

Oxygène: New Master Recording is a new recording by Jean-Michel Jarre of his 1976 album Oxygène. It was released in 2007 by EMI (subsequent releases were on Capitol Records), marking the 30th anniversary of the original's release.

== Release ==
The album was released on enhanced CD, using Opendisc, on November 26, 2007. The art features a 3D model by Giovanni Bourgeois, based on Michel Granger's original design for the cover of Oxygène.

Also in 2007, Disques Dreyfus released Oxygène (The Complete Oxygène), including the original Oxygène, Jarre's sequel album, Oxygène 7–13, and remixes of movements from Oxygène 7–13.

In 2008, The Mail on Sunday newspaper distributed more than two million Oxygène: New Master Recording CDs to its readers in the United Kingdom.

== Live in Your Living Room ==
Jarre, with the assistance of Francis Rimbert, Claude Samard, and Dominique Perrier, performed the entire album live in a studio in Lint, Belgium, without tape or hard disk playback, for a DVD titled Live in Your Living Room. Said Jarre:

Sometimes there are two or three layers of the same sound, each with different phasing and processing. For example, there are several Eminent String Machines that make up one of the main Oxygène string sounds. Having four of us meant I had to multiply the number of instruments, and finding the equipment was quite a headache, especially as I tried, as much as I could, to avoid using instruments produced after Oxygène. There are one or two exceptions but 95 percent of the instruments are of that time. For me it was really important for the radicalism of the process.

The performance includes three additional transition pieces between the main movements. It was shot in 3D as well, and in addition to a standard DVD, an anaglyph 3D DVD, including viewing glasses, was released.

=== Additional performances ===
To promote the rerecorded album, Jarre performed ten concerts in Paris's Théâtre Marigny, a small, 1,000-seat theatre on the Champs-Élysées, from 12 to 26 December 2007. Jarre also performed several additional concerts elsewhere in Europe the following year, including at the Royal Albert Hall in London.

== Track listing ==
=== New Master Recording CD ===
1. "Oxygène Part 1" – 7:39
2. "Oxygène Part 2" – 7:54
3. "Oxygène Part 3" – 3:06
4. "Oxygène Part 4" – 4:13
5. "Oxygène Part 5" – 10:11
6. "Oxygène Part 6" – 7:05

=== Live in Your Living Room 2D DVD ===
Special edition only

1. "Prelude" (new track)
2. "Oxygène Part 1"
3. "Oxygène Part 2"
4. "Oxygène Part 3"
5. "Variation Part 1" (new track)
6. "Oxygène Part 4"
7. "Variation Part 2" (new track)
8. "Oxygène Part 5"
9. "Variation Part 3" (new track)
10. "Oxygène Part 6"
- + The Making Of
- + Instruments Presentation

=== Live in Your Living Room stereoscopic 3D DVD ===
Limited edition only (plus two pairs of 3D glasses)

1. "Prelude" (new track)
2. "Oxygène Part 1"
3. "Oxygène Part 2"
4. "Oxygène Part 3"
5. "Variation Part 1" (new track)
6. "Oxygène Part 4"
7. "Variation Part 2" (new track)
8. "Oxygène Part 5"
9. "Variation Part 3" (new track)
10. "Oxygène Part 6"
- + The Making Of
- + Instruments Presentation
- + 3D gallery

== Charts ==
Chart (2007-2009)	Peak position
Belgian Albums (Ultratop Wallonia)	55
French Albums (SNEP)	40
Hungarian Albums (MAHASZ)	1
Italian Albums (FIMI)	83
Spanish Albums (Promusicae)	67
