= Oxygène 7–13 =

Studio album by Jean-Michel Jarre
- Released: 17 February 1997
- Studios: Oxygene studio Croissy studio
- Length: 41:12
- Labels: Disques Dreyfus; Epic
- Producer: Jean Michel Jarre

Jean-Michel Jarre chronology
Jarremix (1995)	Oxygène 7–13 (1997)	Odyssey Through O_{2} (1998)

Alternative cover
- Cover on the Oxygène Trilogy box set

Singles from Oxygène 7-13
- 1. "Oxygène 8" Released: 10 March 1997; 2. "Oxygène 10" Released: 23 June 1997; 3. "Oxygène 7" Released: October 1997

Professional ratings
Review scores
Source	Rating
AllMusic	3/5 stars

Oxygène 7–13 (known as "Oxygène 2" on the Oxygène Trilogy box set) is the twelfth studio album by French electronic musician and composer Jean-Michel Jarre, released by Disques Dreyfus on 17 February 1997. It is the sequel to his 1976 album Oxygène released two decades before and used the same synthesizers. The album is dedicated to Jarre's former mentor, experimental musician Pierre Schaeffer. The album cover art was created by long-time collaborator Michel Granger. The CD cover used lenticular printing to make the illusion of moving stars in the background.

== Background ==
Oxygène 7-13 is dedicated to his mentor at the GRM, Pierre Schaeffer, who had died two years before. The album was recorded and mixed by Jarre together with Patrick Pelamourges and René Ameline respectively at Oxygene studio and Croissy studio. It was also the last album by Jarre featuring Michel Geiss as collaborator. It also had the collaboration of keyboardist Francis Rimbert and programmer Christian Sales. He combined the "spherical sounds" of the 1976 album with contemporary rhythms. Eschewing digital techniques developed in the 1980s, in an interview for The Daily Telegraph he said:

The excitement of being able to work on sounds in a tactile, manual, almost sensual way is what drew me to electronic music in the first place ... The lack of limitations is very dangerous. It is like the difference for a painter of getting four tubes with four main colours or being in front of a computer with two million colours. You have to scan the two million colours and when you arrive to the last one you have obviously forgotten the first one. In the Eighties we became archivists and everything became rather cold as a result.

== Release ==
Oxygène 7-13 was released in February 1997. "Oxygène 7", "Oxygène 8" and "Oxygène 10" were released as singles. A number of remixes of Oxygène 7–13 tracks were made, including those comprising most of the album Odyssey Through O_{2}. The Orb's "Toxygene" was originally going to be a remix of "Oxygène 8". However, The Orb "obliterated it" and reassembled only a few fragments for their new song. The album was followed by a promotional indoor European tour, and a concert in Moscow, Russia in which he would break for the fourth and last time his record for the largest audience in an open-air concert with a total of 3.5 million.

== Track listing ==
All tracks by Jean-Michel Jarre.

Side one
No.	Title	Length
1.	"Oxygène 7"	11:41
2.	"Oxygène 8"	3:54
3.	"Oxygène 9"	6:13

Side two
No.	Title	Length
1.	"Oxygène 10"	4:16
2.	"Oxygène 11"	4:58
3.	"Oxygène 12"	5:40
4.	"Oxygène 13"	4:27

== Equipment ==
Adapted from liner notes of the album:

- ARP 2600
- EMS VCS 3
- EMS Synthi AKS
- Eminent 310 Unique
- Mellotron M400
- Theremin
- Yamaha CS-80
- Quasimidi Raven
- Digisequencer
- Akai MPC 3000
- Nordlead
- JV 90
- K2000
- RMI Harmonic Synthesizer
- Korg Prophecy
- Roland TR-808
- Roland DJ-70

== Charts ==
=== Weekly charts ===
Chart (1997)	Peak position
Australian Albums (ARIA)	89
Austrian Albums (Ö3 Austria)	2
Belgian Albums (Ultratop Flanders)	19
Belgian Albums (Ultratop Wallonia)	3
Dutch Albums (Album Top 100)	10
Finnish Albums (Suomen virallinen lista)	11
French Albums (SNEP)	6
German Albums (Offizielle Top 100)	19
Hungarian Albums (MAHASZ)	5
New Zealand Albums (RMNZ)	20
Norwegian Albums (VG-lista)	4
Scottish Albums (Official Charts)	25
Spanish Albums (AFYVE)	4
Swedish Albums (Sverigetopplistan)	16
Swiss Albums (Schweizer Hitparade)	24
UK Albums (Official Charts)	11

=== Year-end charts ===
Chart (1997)	Position
Austrian Albums (Ö3 Austria)	26
Belgian Albums (Ultratop Wallonia)	96
Dutch Albums (Album Top 100)	93
German Albums (Offizielle Top 100)	90

== Certifications and sales ==
Region	Certification	Certified units/sales
Austria (IFPI Austria)	Gold	25,000^{*}
Poland (ZPAV)	Gold	50,000^{*}
Spain (Promusicae)	Gold	50,000^{^}
Summaries
Worldwide	—	600,000
^{*} Sales figures based on certification alone.^{^} Shipments figures based on certification alone.
