= Oxygène =

Studio album by Jean-Michel Jarre
- Released: December 1976
- Recorded: August–November 1976
- Studios: Jean-Michel Jarre's home studio, Paris
- Genres: Electronic; ambient; synth-pop; space music; new-age; electropop
- Length: 39:39
- Label: Disques Motors/Polydor
- Producer: Jean-Michel Jarre

Jean-Michel Jarre chronology
Les Granges Brûlées (1973)	Oxygène (1976)	Equinoxe (1978)

Singles from Oxygène
- 1. "Oxygène (Part IV)" Released: January 1977; 2. "Oxygène (Part II)" Released: 1977

Oxygène (French pronunciation: [ɔksiˈʒɛn], English: Oxygen) is the third studio album by French electronic musician and composer Jean-Michel Jarre. It was first released in France in December 1976 by Disques Motors, and distributed internationally in 1977 by Polydor Records. Jarre recorded the album in a makeshift studio that he set up in his apartment in Paris, using a variety of analog and digital synthesizers, and other electronic instruments and effects.

French sound engineer Michel Geiss helped Jarre in the purchase, recording and programming of some instruments used on the album. Jarre's musical style was influenced by musique concrète, developed by Pierre Schaeffer. The album was supported by two singles, "Oxygène (Part II)" and "Oxygène (Part IV)". Following the international success of the latter, the album became Jarre's breakthrough, reaching number one on the French Albums Charts. It was inspired by the track "Popcorn" by German-American electronic composer Gershon Kingsley.

Oxygène has been described as the album that "led the synthesizer revolution of the Seventies" and "an infectious combination of bouncy, bubbling analog sequences and memorable hook lines". The album influenced later artists such as Moby and Brian Canham of Pseudo Echo. In 1978, it would be followed by Equinoxe and in 1979, Jarre held an open-air concert at the Place de la Concorde, causing the sales of both albums to increase, reaching worldwide figures of 15 million copies. As of 2016 it had sold an estimated 18 million copies and is one of the best-selling French, electronic and instrumental albums in history.

== Background ==
In 1967 Jarre travelled to London to sell his electric guitar and amplifier to be able to buy his first synthesizer, an EMS VCS 3 (one of the first units of the instrument), which he used on many of his subsequent albums. He also played guitar in a band named the Dustbins, and mixed instruments including the electric guitar and the flute with tape effects and other sounds. Jarre began working with early analogue synthesizers and tape loops in 1968, and in 1969 he joined the Groupe de Recherches Musicales (lit. 'musical research group'), founded and led by Pierre Schaeffer, who developed musique concrete, a type of music composition that is mainly based on the use of pre-recorded sounds, originating the concept of sampling. Also in that year he mixed the harmony, synthesizers and tape effects to record his debut single "La Cage/Erosmachine". In 1971, he left the institution and dedicated himself to designing Triangle's electronic sound effects; he also went to the Pathé-Marconi record company to release it. Jarre had also done production work for some rock artists, earning enough to set up a small makeshift recording studio in the kitchen of his apartment at 12 Rue de la Trémoille, near the Champs-Élysées in Paris. Initially it included very basic equipment consisting of a few guitar pedals, a Farfisa organ, the EMS VCS 3, and an EMS Synthi AKS; these last two were linked to two Revox tape machines.

One of Schaeffer's former students, the artistic director of Disques Motors, Hélène Dreyfus, convinced her husband Francis Dreyfus to hire Jean-Michel as an employee of his record label. Initially Francis offered Jarre a job as a copyright administrator, however he opted to sign an exclusive songwriting and recording contract. In 1972, the American synth-pop band Hot Butter released a successful version of Gershon Kingsley's "Popcorn". Jarre in that same year released his respective cover version under the pseudonyms Pop Corn Orchestra and Jammie Jefferson. Although unsuccessful, the track would serve as an inspiration for his most successful single, "Oxygène (Part IV)".

Their first two albums as well as their previous single were recorded on the label, Disques Motors, however they were not published there. Jarre released on Sam Fox Productions his debut experimental album Deserted Palace intended to be used in films and on television. It was created using the VCS 3 and RMI Keyboard Computer. In 1973 he composed the soundtrack for the French drama film Les Granges Brûlées (English: The Burned Barns). In its beginnings in the label, he was mainly dedicated to writing music and lyrics for other artists inside and outside the label from 1972 to 1975. The royalties received by Jean-Michel during his collaborations with Françoise Hardy, Gérard Lenorman and Patrick Juvet allowed him to purchase the ARP 2600, used in several of his collaborations with the French singer Christophe and solo works.

In 1974, Jarre attended a conference on the analog synthesizer and the ARP 2600 at the TDF center in Issy-les-Moulineaux. It was carried out by radio and television engineers, and French musical instrument designer Michel Geiss. Later, Jarre contacted Geiss by phone to invite him to his private apartment, Geiss accepted and visited Jean-Michel's makeshift studio, where he had the ARP 2600, the Eminent 310 Unique, the VCS 3 and more. Shortly after meeting, Jarre and Geiss started working together during the recording of Jarre's next album. Geiss, who at that time worked as a maintenance technician at Barclay studios, advised Jarre on the purchase of instruments such as the RMI Harmonic Synthesizer at the Piano Center's music fair, and was in charge of the programming and recording of some of them. Later, Jarre managed to finance the purchase of a Scully 8-track studio recorder and a mixture of Ampex 256 and 3M tape. In that same year, he composed the opening jingle for the A4 autoroute (also known as autoroute de l'Est), some media such as The Telegraph pointed out the possible original incarnation of "Oxygène (Part IV)" in the jingle.

== Composition and recording ==
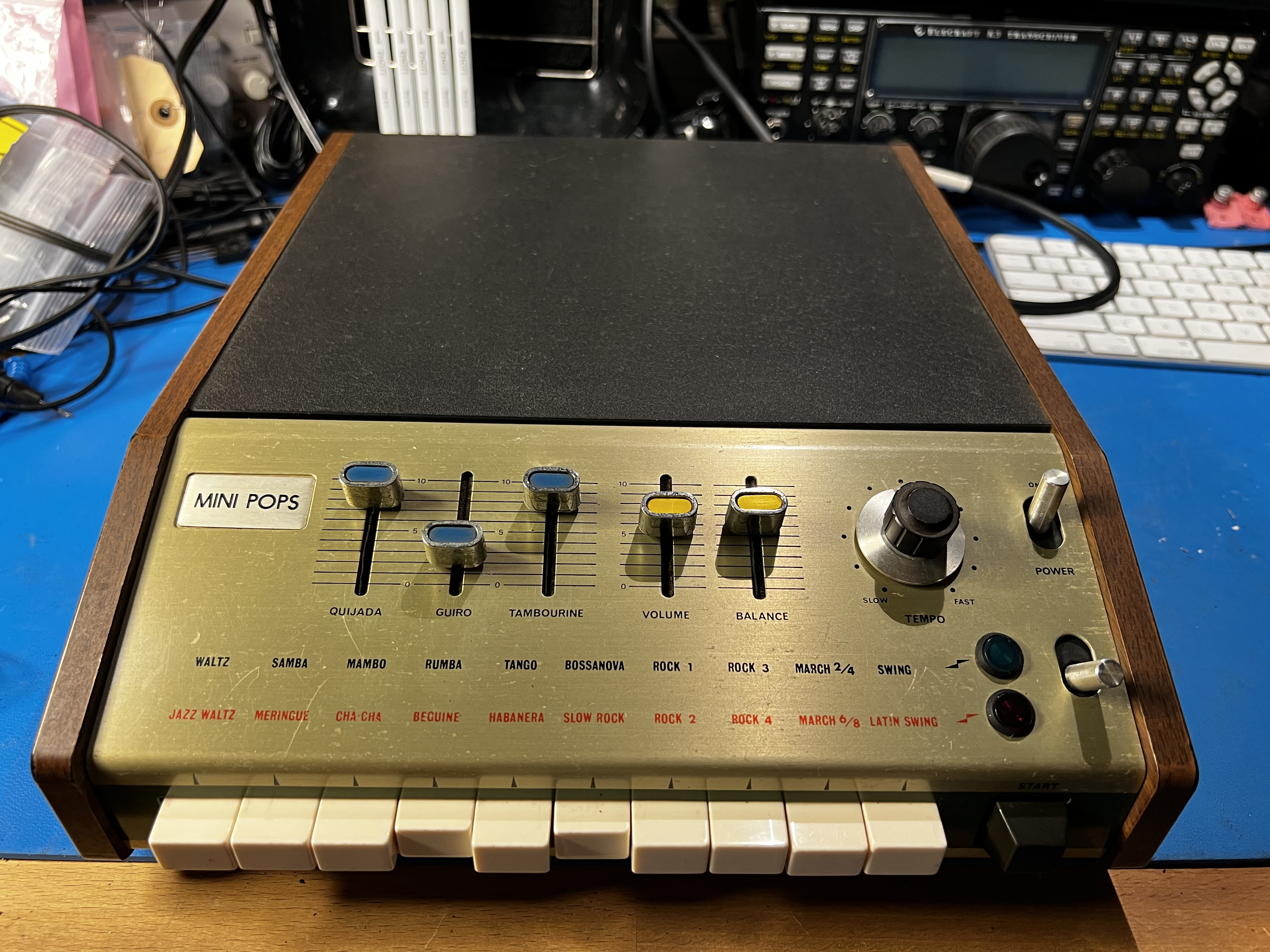
The Korg Mini-Pops 7 drum machine was used in different Oxygène tracks

Jarre recorded Oxygène between August and November 1976, using the makeshift recording studio in his apartment. In the Ferber studio Jarre recovered his old Mellotron that had few functional keys to write the first piece of music for the album, "Oxygène (Part II)". During the recording of the album Jarre used a Revox tape to delay the sound coming out of a speaker in order to achieve a "huge sense of space". This liberal use of echo was used on the various sound effects generated by the EMS VCS 3 synthesiser. The persistent allusions to terrestrial elements and the biosphere meant that the album would frequently be associated with the new-age musical movement.

A reverb effect was made through the VCS 3. Jarre also used an AKG stereo reverb and an EMT plate reverb which was meters long in live performances, and eight different stereo echoes. Some little beep sounds were played on the EMS Synthi AKS, as were the waves sound used in "Oxygène (Part II)". The album also included electronic "evocations of chirping birds".

Jarre used various other synthesizers and electronic instruments to create the tracks of "symphonic electronic music" on Oxygène. The sounds of the Farfisa organ were heavily modified. Geiss programmed specific sounds in the ARP 2600, among them the main sound of "Oxygène (Part IV)" and the "breathing" waves sound in "Oxygène (Part VI)". The Eminent 310 organ as well as the VCS 3 went through a phase pedal for guitars Electro-Harmonix Small Stone Phaser in order to provide the string pads used on the album. The main sequence of "Oxygène (Part V)" was created with an RMI Keyboard Computer, while both the Keyboard Computer and the RMI Harmonic Synthesizer were used on "Oxygène (Part IV)", "Oxygène (Part V)" and "Oxygène (Part VI)".

Some of the drum sounds on the album were produced using adhesive tape to hold down two preset buttons on a Korg Mini-Pops 7 drum machine simultaneously – "Oxygène (Part IV)" mixed the "rock" and "slow rock" presets, while "Oxygène (Part VI)" mixed "rhumba" and "bossa nova". "Oxygène (Part II)" instead used only the "swing" preset. The album was mixed by sound engineer Jean-Pierre Janiaud and his assistant Patrick Foulon at the Gang studio, it also was mastered at Translab studio.

== Artwork ==
The cover art features a skull inside a dismembered Earth and is an adaptation of a 30 x 40 cm (12" x 16") watercolor, also named Oxygène, by the French painter Michel Granger. A picture of the painting was first published in 1972 in the magazine Pilote, and in 1976 the artwork was displayed at the Marquet Gallery, in rue Bonaparte in Paris. Jean-Michel visited this gallery and bought it, then Granger received a phone call from the gallery director to inform him that Jarre wanted to see him in person. On 15 September 1976, Jarre met with Granger so that he could modify the background of the watercolor and adapt it to the square shape of an LP record.

The album title was taken from the artwork because he considered that he "perfectly adheres to the spirit of the songs". Jarre said: "30 years ago there weren't so many people thinking about the planet. But I've always been interested in that, not necessarily in a political way but in a poetic, surrealistic way." Jarre also told the English newspaper The Guardian that "in a way, I wanted to link everything to nature and environmental issues". Granger stated that "Oxygène was part of a series about the damage being done to our planet. It was a pretty violent image for a record cover." He added, "That picture is the best known of all my work. It's my Mona Lisa. But I don't feel like it belongs to me any more. It belongs to anyone who loves the music of Jean-Michel Jarre."

== Release ==
"Oxygène Part IV"
"Oxygène (Part IV)" is Jarre's most successful single

Oxygène was turned down by several record companies such as Island Records founded by Chris Blackwell, who later thought that he made two professional mistakes in his life: rejecting Oxygène and Elton John's first album, Empty Sky. Jean-Michel decided to meet once again with Francis, the head of the Disques Motors label to see if he could release the album, to which he immediately agreed saying: "Right, well we have a world success...".

Oxygène was released in December 1976 in France, and the first pressing of 50,000 copies were given away to a limited number of hi-fi shops vendors. They used a few copies of the album to showcase its stereo sound qualities to their customers, and also as an example of "state-of-the-art sound". These copies were also promoted through clubs and discos. In addition, Jean-Michel and Francis did a promotional poster campaign in Paris.

In early 1977, Jarre together with long-time collaborator Juvet decided to put together the same team from the album Mort ou vif and set about writing the album Paris by Night, which contained the hit single "Où sont les femmes?". The album was released in June and topped the charts. After another album with Christophe entitled La dolce vita in the same year, Jarre decided to stop writing music and lyrics for other artists and preferred to dedicate himself entirely to his solo musical career.

In 1977, the album was released internationally by Polydor Records, and by April, it had sold 70,000 copies in France. "Oxygène (Part IV)" was Jarre's breakthrough single worldwide, peaking at number four on the UK Singles Chart. This success led to the album reaching number one on the French Albums Charts, number two on the UK Albums and number seventy-eight on the US Billboard Top LPs & Tape. "Oxygène (Part II)" was edited to about 3 minutes to be released in France as a single.

"Oxygène (Part IV)" began to play on the most important radio stations in his native country and the United Kingdom. Europe 1 used it as the theme of two of its regular programs, Hit Parade directed by Jean-Loup Lafont and basketball show Basket sur Europe 1 in the credit titles. The radio station also dedicated an hour and a half to a program in Jean-Michel's studio, and played the entire album, bringing his music to millions of people. It was played on Dutch radio and television throughout the two days in 1977 that South Moluccan terrorists held. The BBC used the album in a documentary; BBC Radio 1 also played it, and it was used in television programs such as Antenne 2 or Récré A2.

When interviewed in Billboard magazine, Motors' director Stanislas Witold said, "In a sense we're putting most of our bets on Jean-Michel Jarre. He is quite exceptional and we're sure that by 1980 he will be recognised worldwide." In Dublin, Ireland, a phone-a-disk system was used, whereby a phone call played about two minutes of the album along with an advertising message. On 2 October 1977, he was invited by host Jacques Martin to an episode of his Sunday program L'orchestre d'Antenne 2, in which the orchestra performed his single "Oxygene (Part IV)". Jarre also received nearly 25 gold records worldwide. In the United States it sold over 100,000 copies in Los Angeles alone, and by the end of 1977 it had sold 300,000 copies nationwide.

Later, Francis created a label called Disques Dreyfus. Equinoxe was released in that label in 1978. It continued with a "familiar style, exploring the emotive power of orchestrated electronic rhythms and melody." In 1979, Jarre performed an open-air concert at the Place de la Concorde, this event caused the sales of both albums to increase, each sold around 1.5 million copies in France and were certified platinum in 1981; both sold 11 million worldwide in November 1979. By 1981, the album had sold an estimated 15 million copies worldwide, and by 2016 an estimated 18 million, being one of the best-selling French, electronic and instrumental albums in history.

== Critical reception ==
Professional ratings
Review scores
Source	Rating
AllMusic	5/5 stars
Mojo	5/5 stars
Record Mirror	4/5 stars
The Rolling Stone Album Guide	2/5 stars

Reaction to the album upon its release in the UK in 1977 was largely negative: the British music press, more interested in the developing UK punk scene, was oriented towards guitar-based music and hostile to most electronic music. Angus MacKinnon of the NME described the album as "another interminable cosmic cruise. The German spacers ([Tangerine] Dream, Schulze et al) mapped this part of the electronic galaxy aeons ago ... The album's [...] infuriatingly derivative. Explore its prime influences instead."

Considering the album as a French version of Mike Oldfield's work, Music Week said: "Unfortunately, Jarre has produced a work that is ponderous in its self-conscious musicality – he definitely wears his art on his sleeve. Unlike Oldfield, he never stands back and laughs at his own creation. It is heavy throughout, and his influences continually jog the elbow – particularly the lugubrious touches of Mahler and the almost continuous Bach underpinning." The magazine concluded by saying that "so some interest will be generated but the album is not really suited to our insular and musically antiintellectual Anglo-Saxon island."

Karl Dallas of Melody Maker was kinder towards the album, saying that "the first time I heard this album I hated it ... It seemed so bland, so undemanding, so uneventful. I've got to admit it repays further listening, and that it is not quite the electronic Muzak I had written it off as initially." He also stated that it "is not classical music" and that: "Though the track [referring to "Oxygène Part IV"] the discos are playing is, as you might expect, actually its least effective section musically, it has the same relationship to popular music as Tangerine Dream, say, or Oldfield. Personally, it still does not impress me as much as either, except at a technical level. It seems to lack heart, the sense of passionate involvement in the act of music-making which makes Edgar Froese's work almost a musical equivalent of a Jackson Pollock painting. It is almost too accomplished, too formally precise."

The most positive review came from Robin Smith of Record Mirror, in which he stated that, "It's pretty tough to communicate warmth through such music and the end product is usually stilted but Jean Michael Jarre has laid down a variety of forms joined together by cohesive lines." He also described Jarre as a "French Mike Oldfield" by "possessing the same emotive powers." He concluded by saying side one "ends on ghost-like notes" while the side two "has a rushing opening like the breaking of a barrier." Record World magazine commented that it is "an unusually melodic theme" that "is carried over both sides with all instruments played by Jarre himself".

Retrospective reviews regard the album as a major work in the development of electronic music. Phil Alexander of Mojo listed it as one of Jarre's three key albums and wrote that it was "his conscious attempt to unite the worlds of avant-garde, electronic, classical and progressive music." He said that its "dynamic, warm sound is intoxicating" and regarding "Oxygène (Part IV)", he finished saying it is "an unlikely UK Top 5 hit from what remains an elegant cornerstone of electronic music."

Jim Brenholts from AllMusic stated that it "is one of the original e-music albums" and that it "has withstood the test of time and the evolution of digital electronica." He also considered that "Jarre's compositional style and his rhythmic instincts were his strong points in 1976" and that "the innocence and freshness provide most of its charm. Jarre's techniques and ability provide the rest." The album was considered one of the most influential albums of 1976 by uDiscover Music, and was included in the book 1001 Albums You Must Hear Before You Die. "Oxygène (Part I)" was considered by Billboard writer Lars Brandle as one of the electronic chillout tunes from back in the day.

=== Accolades ===
Publication	Country	Accolade	Year	Rank
FNAC	France	The Ideal Discography: 823 Indispensables Albums	2015	*
RoRoRo Rock-Lexicon	Germany	Most Recommended Albums	2003	*
Giannis Petridis	Greece	2004 of the Best Albums of the Century	2003	*
Panorama	Norway	The 30 Best Albums of the Year 1970-98	1999	10
Robert Dimery	United Kingdom	1001 Albums You Must Hear Before You Die	2011	*
(*) designates lists that are unordered.

== Legacy ==
Oxygène won the Grand Prix du Disque (English: Disc Grand Prize) award by L'Académie Charles Cros, and American magazine People chose Jarre as the "Personality of the Year". A sequel, Oxygène 7–13, was released two decades later in 1997. In 2007, a new version of the original album titled Oxygène: New Master Recording was released, and in 2016 another sequel titled Oxygène 3 was released on the 40th anniversary of Oxygène.

Welsh music writer Mark Jenkins commented that the album "achieved a dynamic compromise between imaginative sound textures and accessible melodies that for one reason or another had been denied to earlier synthesizer artists". The album has been used for music therapy, meditation and births. Some of the music was used on the soundtracks of the 1978 film Snake in the Eagle's Shadow and the 1981 film Gallipoli.

Oxygène has been described as "one of the biggest catalysts to widespread use of the synthesizer in the 1970s" and influenced electronic artists like Moby, who collaborated with Jarre on his 2015 album, Electronica 1: The Time Machine. Brian Canham of Australian band Pseudo Echo said in Music Feeds that it was a "major influence on my production, song-writing and synthesizer programming with Pseudo Echo, and another of my projects, Origene, hence the homage in the namesake".

== Track listing ==
All tracks are composed by Jean-Michel Jarre.

Side one

1. "Oxygène (Part I)" – 7:39
2. "Oxygène (Part II)" – 7:49
3. "Oxygène (Part III)" – 3:16

Side two

1. "Oxygène (Part IV)" – 4:14
2. "Oxygène (Part V)" – 10:23
3. "Oxygène (Part VI)" – 6:20

== Personnel ==
Personnel listed in the album's liner notes.

- Jean-Michel Jarre – production
- Jean-Pierre Janiaud – mixing engineer
- Patrick Foulon – mixing assistant
- Michel Granger – artwork
- David Bailey – back photography
- Dave Dadwater - digital remastering with Yakuda Audio (2014 remaster only)
- Charlotte Rampling - inner sleeve photo (2014 remaster only)

== Equipment ==
Adapted from the liner notes of the 2014 remastered version.

- ARP 2600
- Eminent 310 Unique Organ
- EMS Synthi AKS
- EMS VCS 3
- Farfisa Professional Organ
- Korg Mini-Pops 7
- RMI Harmonic Synthesizer
- EKO ComputeRhythm
- Mellotron

== Charts ==
=== Weekly charts ===
Chart performance for Oxygène
Chart (1977)	Peak position
Australian Albums (Kent Music Report)	29
Austrian Albums (Ö3 Austria)	10
Canada Top Albums/CDs (RPM)	65
Dutch Albums (Album Top 100)	4
Finnish Charts (Suomen virallinen albumilista)	12
French Albums (SNEP)	1
German Albums (Offizielle Top 100)	8
Italian Albums (Musica e dischi)	15
New Zealand Albums (RMNZ)	3
Norwegian Albums (VG-lista)	9
Spanish Albums (PROMUSICAE)	4
Swedish Albums (Sverigetopplistan)	3
UK Albums (Official Charts)	2
US Billboard 200	78

Chart (2005)	Peak position
Polish Albums (ZPAV)	36
Chart (2007)	Peak position
UK Album Downloads (Official Charts)	35

Chart (2015)	Peak position
French Albums (SNEP)	146
UK Progressive Albums (Official Charts)	12

Chart (2019)	Peak position
Swiss Albums (Schweizer Hitparade)	85

=== Year-end charts ===
1977 year-end chart performance for Oxygène
Chart (1977)	Position
Dutch Albums (Dutch Top 100)	38
UK Albums (OCC)	20

== Certifications and sales ==
Certifications and sales for Oxygène
Region	Certification	Certified units/sales
Australia (ARIA)	Platinum	50,000^{^}
Belgium	—	25,000
Canada (Music Canada)	Platinum	100,000^{^}
France (SNEP)	Platinum	1,500,000
Germany (BVMI)	Gold	250,000^{^}
Japan	—	32,000
Netherlands	—	50,000
Poland (ZPAV)	Gold	10,000^{‡}
Sweden	—	60,000
United Kingdom (BPI)	Platinum	300,000^{^}
United States	—	300,000
Summaries
Worldwide	—	15,000,000
^{^} Shipments figures based on certification alone.^{‡} Sales+streaming figures based on certification alone.

== Bibliography ==
- Pezzi, Davide (17 May 2021), Quello che le canzoni non dicono: Storie e segreti dietro alle nostre canzoni del cuore (in Italian), Youcanprint, ISBN 979-12-203-3446-4
- Rachele, Sal (1994), Life on the Cutting Edge, Light Technology Publishing, ISBN 096-405-350-0
- Duguay, Michael (2018), Jean Michel Jarre, Books on Demand, ISBN 978-284-993-324-4
- Jarre, Jean-Michael (2019), Mélancolique Rodéo, Robert Laffont, ISBN 978-222-124-618-4
- Remilleux, Jean-Louis (1988), Jean-Michel Jarre (English ed.), Futura Publications Ltd., ISBN 0-7088-4263-1
- Hughes, Alex; Reader, Keith (2003), Encyclopedia of contemporary French culture, CRC Press, ISBN 0-203-00330-6
- Jenkins, Mark (2007), Analog synthesizers, Elsevier, ISBN 978-0-240-52072-8
