= ARP String Synthesizer =

Synthesizer

String Synthesizer
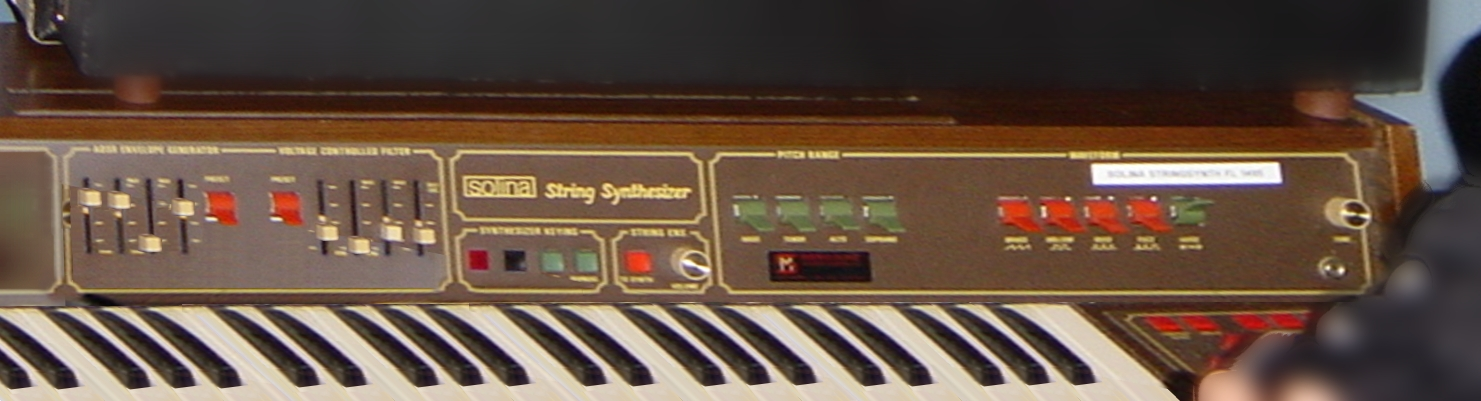
- Solina String Synthesizer (partially)
- Manufacturer: Eminent B.V., ARP Instruments, Inc.
- Dates: 1975

Technical specifications
- Polyphony: 16
- Oscillator: 1
- LFO: 1
- Synthesis type: Analog Subtractive
- Filter: yes
- Attenuator: ADSR
- Storage memory: none

Input/output
- Keyboard: 49-key
- External control: CV/Gate

The Solina String Synthesizer, also erroneously known as the ARP Solina String Synthesizer or sometimes the ARP String Synthesizer, is a combination of a string synthesizer and synthesizer. It is a hybrid model which combined both the Solina String Ensemble string synthesizer and the ARP Explorer monophonic synthesizer. It was built in Bodegraven, Netherlands by Eminent B.V. Supposedly only about 100 were ever produced. The addition of the ARP Explorer to the Solina string sounds made for a very powerful combination.

== Keyboard modes ==
- Strings Only
- Strings through the Explorer low-pass filter
- Explorer voice combined with the lower Solina keyboard (contrabass and cello)
- Explorer voice combined with the upper Solina keyboard (viola, violin, trumpet, horn)

== Variations ==
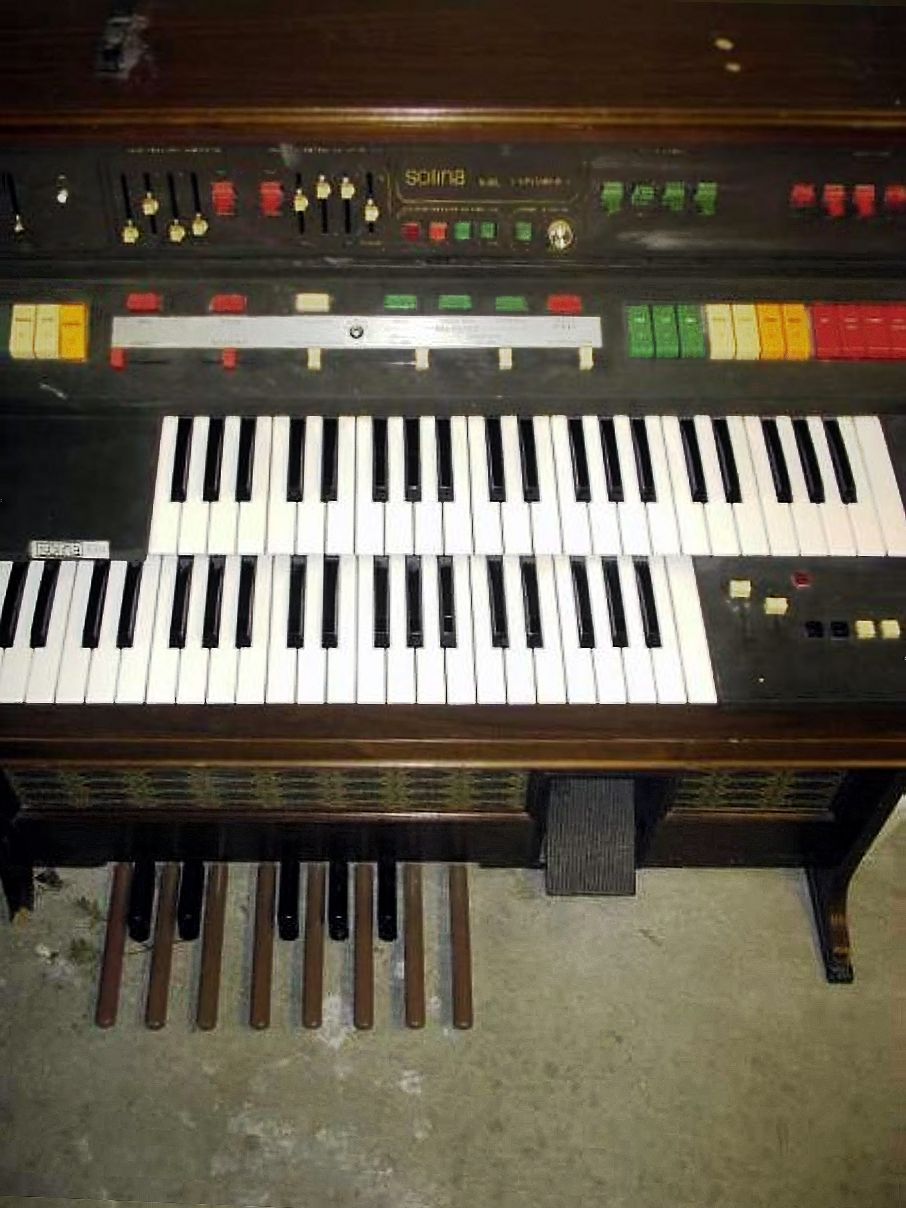
Solina C112s

The manufacturer of Solina series, Eminent B.V., also shipped a home organ model, named Solina C112s (with "Explore I" logo), which included ARP Explorer I.
