= An Electric Storm =

Studio album by White Noise
- Released: June 1969
- Recorded: 1968
- Studios: Kaleidophon Studio (Camden Town, London, England)
- Genres: Electronic; avant-pop; psychedelic pop; experimental pop
- Length: 35:06
- Label: Island
- Producer: David Vorhaus (production coordinator)

White Noise chronology
An Electric Storm (1969)	White Noise 2 - Concerto for Synthesizer (1974)

Professional ratings
Review scores
Source	Rating
AllMusic	4/5 stars
Pitchfork	8.6/10

An Electric Storm is the debut album by the electronic music group White Noise. The idea for the album began with the bassist and sound engineer David Vorhaus, who, inspired by the English musician and composer Delia Derbyshire's breakthrough work in creating early electronic music sounds and synthesizers for the pioneering BBC Radiophonic Workshop, collaborated with Derbyshire and the English composer Brian Hodgson to marry electronic sounds with contemporary late 1960s pop music rhythms and melodies.

Although not a commercial success on release, it has since become a cult favourite and has been especially influential on electronic musicians.

== Background ==
The band recorded the first two tracks with the intention of producing a single only but were then persuaded by Chris Blackwell of Island Records to create an entire album. At this point the group had established the Kaleidophon Studio in a flat in Camden Town, London, and spent a year creating the next four tracks. The last track was put together in one day when Island demanded the completion of the album.

== Influence ==
Although not very successful on its initial release, the album is now considered an important and influential album in the development of electronic music. Chris Carter of Throbbing Gristle has called it "the most groundbreaking yet completely underrated electronic record of the 20th century".

A brief extract from the track "Black Mass: An Electric Storm in Hell" can be heard in the Hammer Film Productions film Dracula AD 1972.

== Track listing ==
Phase-In

No.	Title	Writer(s)	Length
1.	"Love without Sound"	Delia Derbyshire; David Vorhaus	3:07
2.	"My Game of Loving"	Georgina Duncan; Vorhaus	4:10
3.	"Here Come the Fleas"	John McDonald; Vorhaus	2:15
4.	"Firebird"	Derbyshire; Vorhaus	3:05
5.	"Your Hidden Dreams"	McDonald; Vorhaus	4:58

Phase-Out

No.	Title	Writer(s)	Length
6.	"The Visitation"	McDonald; Vorhaus	11:14
7.	"Black Mass: An Electric Storm in Hell"	Duncan; Derbyshire; Vorhaus; Paul Lytton; Brian Hodgson	7:22

== Personnel ==
The following people contributed to An Electric Storm:

- David Vorhaus – production co-ordinator
- Delia Derbyshire, Brian Hodgson – electronic sound realisation
- Paul Lytton – percussion
- John Whitman, Annie Bird, Val Shaw – vocals

== Releases ==
- June 1969 - LP, Island Records, catalogue number ILPS 9099
- 27 March 1995
- 9 July 2007
