= ARP String Ensemble =

Polyphonic multi-orchestral synthesizer

Solina String Ensemble
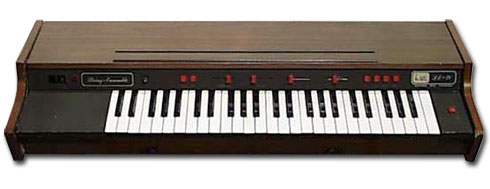
- ARP badged Solina String Ensemble
- Manufacturer: Eminent BV
- Dates: 1974–1981

Technical specifications
- Polyphony: Full
- Timbrality: Six tones: violin, viola, trumpet, horn, cello, contrabass
- Oscillator: Sub-octave divider network
- LFO: Two
- Synthesis type: Analog Subtractive
- Filter: None
- Attenuator: AR
- Storage memory: None
- Effects: Chorus

Input/output
- Keyboard: 49 keys
- Left-hand control: None
- External control: Gate out

Sound sample

The Solina String Ensemble, also marketed as the ARP String Ensemble, is a fully polyphonic multi-orchestral combined digital/analog string synthesizer with a 49-key keyboard, produced by Eminent BV (known for its Solina brand). It was distributed in the United States by ARP Instruments from 1974 to 1981. The sounds it incorporates are violin, viola, trumpet, horn, cello, and contrabass. The keyboard uses 'organ style' divide-down technology to make it polyphonic. The built-in chorus effect gives the instrument its distinctive sound.

== Technology ==
The core technology is based on the string ensemble section of the Eminent 310 Unique electronic organ in 1972, manufactured by the Dutch company Eminent BV. The main oscillator consists of twelve discrete tone generators with octave divide-down to provide full polyphony; and the built-in triple chorus effect utilizes bucket-brigade devices (BBDs) controlled by two LFOs to create the characteristic vibrato.

Four versions have been released:

- SE-I: Mono Output with a permanent chorus effect
- SE-II: Mono Output with an ON/OFF switch for the chorus effect
- SE-III: Stereo Outputs with a redesigned chorus effect
- SE-IV: Stereo Outputs with LEDs added on the front panel

== Notable users ==
The Solina String Ensemble was extensively used by pop, rock, jazz and disco artists of the 1970s, including Richard Wright of Pink Floyd, on albums such as Wish You Were Here (most notably on "Shine On You Crazy Diamond") and Animals, Herbie Hancock, Bernie Worrell, Billy Beck (of Ohio Players), Kerry Livgren (of Kansas), Dennis DeYoung and Eumir Deodato. Parliament used the Solina on several tracks, particularly as a solo instrument on songs such as "Chocolate City", “Give Up the Funk (Tear the Roof Off the Sucker)” and "Flash Light". Elton John used a String Ensemble on his hit song "Someone Saved My Life Tonight", the Rolling Stones in their hit "Fool to Cry", KC & the Sunshine Band in their hit "Please Don't Go", the Buggles in "Video Killed the Radio Star", Hall & Oates in their cover version of "You've Lost That Lovin' Feeling", and Rick James in "Mary Jane". OMD used the device on their album Dazzle Ships (1983).

== Recreations ==
Various virtual plugins and VSTs of the Solina String Ensemble exists, such the Solina V by Arturia. Behringer has released an analog hardware clone.

== Gallery ==
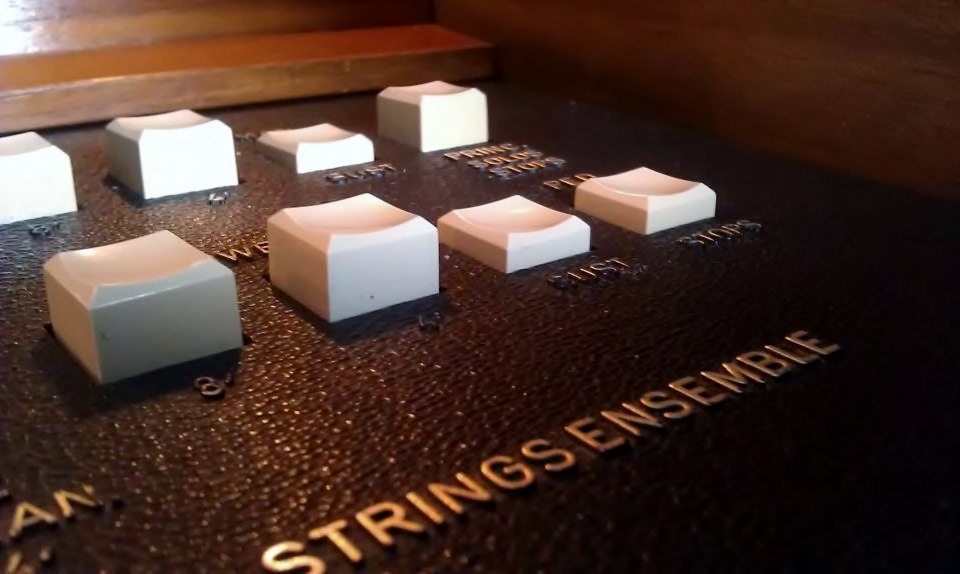
"String Ensemble" section of Eminent 310 Theatre organ

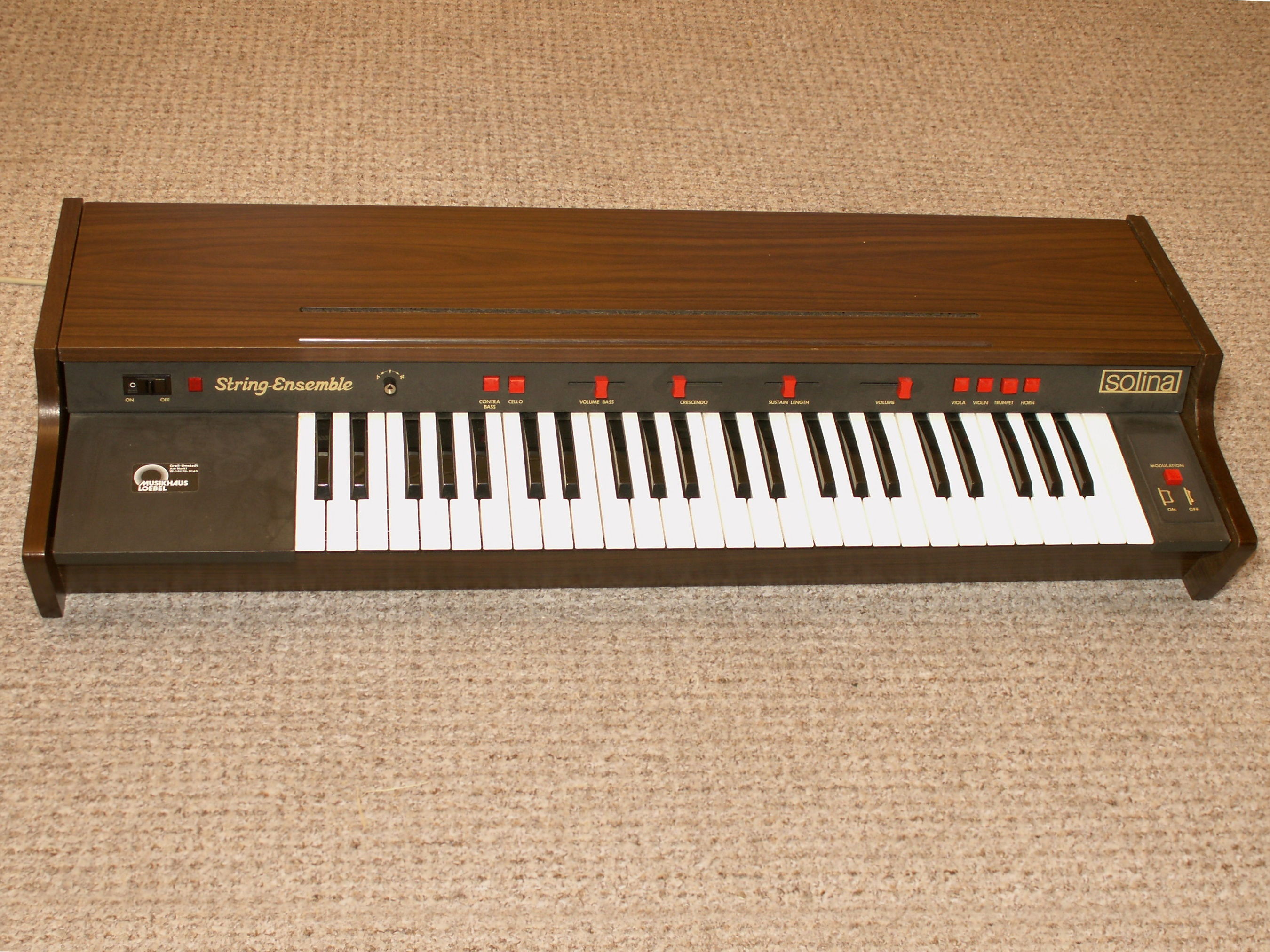
Solina String Ensemble, the original version of String Ensemble, derived from Eminent organ

Improvisation with a MC-303, a MicroKorg, a Solina String Ensemble mk1 and a Telecaster electric guitar

== See also ==
- ARP String Synthesizer
- ARP Instruments
