= Odyssey Through O2 =

Odyssey Through O_{2}

Remix album by Jean-Michel Jarre
- Released: 18 May 1998
- Recorded: 1997–1998
- Genre: Electronic, trance, house, dance
- Length: 66:04
- Producer: Jean-Michel Jarre

Jean-Michel Jarre chronology
Oxygène 7–13 (1997)	Odyssey Through O_{2} (1998)	Métamorphoses (2000)

Professional ratings
Review scores
Source	Rating
AllMusic	2.5/5 stars

Odyssey Through O_{2} is an album by Jean-Michel Jarre, released in 1998. It contains remixes of tracks from Jean Michel Jarre's Oxygène 7–13 album, as well as the "Rendez-Vous 98" single. It also contains a computer program, JArKaos, a scaled down version of the ArKaos software used by Jarre to produce visual accompaniment to his music at concerts. JArKaos allows users to manipulate visuals using their computer keyboard while listening to the album.

== Track listing ==
1. "Odyssey Overture" – 0:53
2. "Oxygene 10" (Transcengenics, remix by Loop Guru) – 4:01
3. "Oxygene 7" (DJ Cam Remix) – 4:22
4. "Oxygene 8" (Hani's Oxygene 303) – 4:19
5. "Oxygene 8" (Hani's Oxygene 303 Reprise) – 2:31
6. "Odyssey Phase 2" – 0:33
7. "Oxygene 10" (Resistance D Treatment) – 6:43
8. "Oxygene 8" (Transmix) – 3:42
9. "Oxygene 8" (Sunday Club Mix) – 7:32
10. "Oxygene 10" (@440 Remix Dub) – 5:47
11. "Odyssey Phase 3" – 0:14
12. "Oxygene 11" (Remix) – 0:55
13. "Oxygene 12" (Claude Monnet Remix) – 5:15
14. "Oxygene 8" (Takkyū Ishino Extended Mix) – 4:21
15. "Odyssey Finale" – 2:06
16. "Rendez-Vous 98" (@440 Remix) – 7:14
17. "Oxygene 13" (TK Remix) – 5:36
