= Eminent BV =

Eminent digital organs is a brand of electronic organ for use in churches, halls and homes. The company is headquartered in Lelystad (Flevoland), The Netherlands.

The principal sound generation technique used by Eminent is Additive synthesis. Modelling the sound is done by a professional organ "voicer", who finishes the organ in its location, much like the process of regulating and voicing a pipe organ.

== History ==
It begins in 1923 when Jacob Vreeken (1899–1976) made an original organ with commercial electronic material. At the time, this organ was based on analog technology. In 1959 the company introduced its first electronic organ, the "Eminent 60", based on the work of Johannes Versteegt (1928–2011). In 1970 the "Eminent Solina" trademark came from production of Swiss organs by Eminent under license of the Swiss company Research Solina AG. In 1974 the Solina String Ensemble was launched, using synthesizer technology introduced by the Eminent 310 organ in 1972. In 1977 the "Eminent Omegan" trademark was launched for high-quality electronic church organs.

== Notable users ==
An Eminent 310 organ was prominently featured on the Jean-Michel Jarre albums Oxygène (1977) and Equinoxe (1978). It was also used for the well-known arpeggiated element of "Baba O'Riley" by The Who.

The Solina String Ensemble was used extensively by pop, rock, jazz and disco artists, including Herbie Hancock, Elton John, Pink Floyd, Stevie Wonder, The Carpenters, George Clinton, Eumir Deodato, the Rolling Stones, the Buggles, Rick James, George Harrison, Lucio Battisti and the Bee Gees.
