= Mark Jenkins (musician) =

Welsh musician

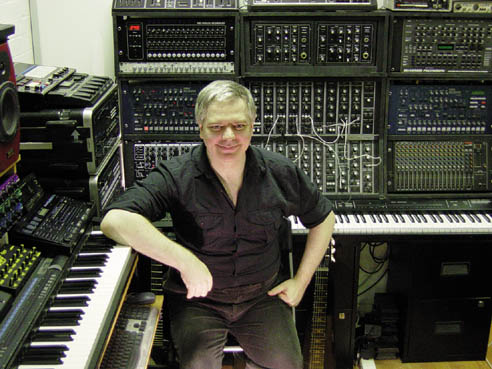
Jenkins in his London studio in 2005

Mark Jenkins (born 1960) is a Welsh musician and music writer. He has written interviews and instrument reviews for UK and international magazines including Melody Maker, New Musical Express, Music Week, International Musician, Keyboard (US), and Mac Format, and has also written a book, Analog Synthesizers, 2nd Edition 2019. He currently writes for the US magazine, Synth & Software.

== Biography ==
Jenkins studied a Combined Arts course at university; he worked in the university television and electronic music studios to create his first live performances. Graduating with a BA Honours degree, he became Music Editor of the magazine Electronics & Music Maker. Working on other publications he interviewed artists including Philip Glass, Depeche Mode, Isao Tomita, Karlheinz Stockhausen and Duran Duran and reviewed instruments from Moog Music, Yamaha, Roland, Sequential Circuits and others. Many of these features have been archived by the Muzines website. He gave further live performances at London Olympia, the London Planetarium and the Queen Elizabeth Hall among other venues.

Jenkins formed the label AMP Music in 1983. He has performed with David Vorhaus as White Noise at venues including the Bochum Planetarium, Germany, and the All Tomorrow's Parties festival. He also performed at the Peter Harrison Planetarium at The Royal Observatory in 2009. In 2012 Taylor & Francis published a new book by Jenkins, iPad Music following his release of the world's first all-iPad CD album in October 2010, and the Analog Synthesizers book was revised and updated interviewing artists such as Suzanne Ciani, Paul Haslinger, Hans Zimmer and the composers of Stranger Things in 2019.

In 2020 Mark Jenkins launched the ZyXyZ Books imprint with the matching volumes "Tangerine Dream: 50 Years - The Ultimate Discography", "Klaus Schulze: 50 Years - The Ultimate Discography" and "Kraftwerk: 50 Years - The Ultimate Discography". All three books were sold around the world through Amazon.

Mark Jenkins lives in London and performs worldwide.

== Albums ==
- Analog Archives (1986, re-mastered and expanded 2022)
- Space Dreams (1990, re-mastered and expanded 2022)
- Thunder at Midnight (1992)
- Mexico Rising (1994)
- Space Dreams 2 (1996)
- Moog Meditations (1998)
- Sequencer Loops (2003)
- Sequencer Loops 2 (2004)
- If The World Were Turned on Its Head, We Would Walk Among The Stars (2005)
- Live with Damo Suzuki at the Queen Elizabeth Hall (2005)
- Live in the USA (2006)
- This Island Earth (2007)
- Ghosts of Mars; Something Dancing in the Darkness (2008)
- The iPad Album (2010)
- EX1GENE (2012)
- CHANGE OF COSMIC ADDRESS: New Music In Tribute to Edgar Froese (w. Chris Jenkins) (2015)
- Mike Oldfield's TUBULAR BELLS for the MOOG SYNTHESIZER (2017)
- Influences (2018)
- Krautnoise; 1st (2019)
- Perpetual Music Vol. 1 (2019)
- CELLISTICA: 1st FLIGHT (w. Hannah Chappell, cello) (2020)
- MODULAR SESSIONS Nos. 1-9 (editor and contributor) (2022)

== Selected concerts ==
- London Olympia, 1986
- London Planetarium, 1989
- Brazilia Teatro Nacional, 1992
- London Astoria, 1991 & 1992
- London Queen Elizabeth Hall, 2005
- Philadelphia Franklin Institute Planetarium, 2005
- Pittsburgh Carnegie Center Planetarium, 2005
- Long Island NY Vanderbilt Planetarium, 2006
- Bochum Planetarium, Germany, 2008
- Greenwich Planetarium, London, 2009
- E-Live Festival, the Netherlands, 2010
- APosition Festival, Russia, 2012
- Seventh Wave Festival, Birmingham, 2019
- Ommadawn 45 Mike Oldfield convention 2022
