= Oxygen SpA =

Italian automobile manufacturer

Oxygen SpA is an Italian company that manufactures "green vehicles". They produce the Oxygen Electric Cargo-scooter.

Oxygen S.p.A. is the first Italian company to develop, manufacture and market 100% electric scooters. Oxygen's product is the all-electric CargoScooter, designed specifically for the delivery market and the first of its kind intended primarily for inner-city delivery use.

Based in Padua, Italy, Oxygen was created in 2001 as a technological development of Atala. Under new management since 2004, the strategic direction has been mainly focused on the fleet market.

== Clients ==
Oxygen provides electric scooters to a number of major delivery fleets. Swiss Post is one of the company's higher profile clients and has acquired a fleet of over 1500 CargoScooters.

== Vehicles ==
Oxygen's CargoScooter is totally electric and features Lithium-Ion (Li-Ion) battery technology.

Model	Power and max. speed	Max. distance on one charge
CargoScooter	4 kW (50cc) e 45 km/h	60 km
CargoScooter XR	4 kW (50cc) e 45 km/h	90 km
CargoScooter LP	4 kW (50cc) e 45 km/h	120 km
CargoScooter XP	6 kW (125cc) e 65 km/h	50 km
CargoScooter XP - LR	6 kW (125cc) e 65 km/h	75 km
CargoScooter XP - XR	6 kW (125cc) e 65 km/h	100 km

== Awards ==
In recognition of the company's achievements, Oxygen was nominated at the 2007 World Mail Awards in the Corporate Social Responsibility category for its CargoScooter.

In 2009 the Italian Minister for the Environment mentioned Oxygen and the CargoScooter in the “Italian Design for Sustainability” book.
