= Oxygen Square =

Urban square in Bangladesh

Coordinates: 22.3934973°N 91.821526°E

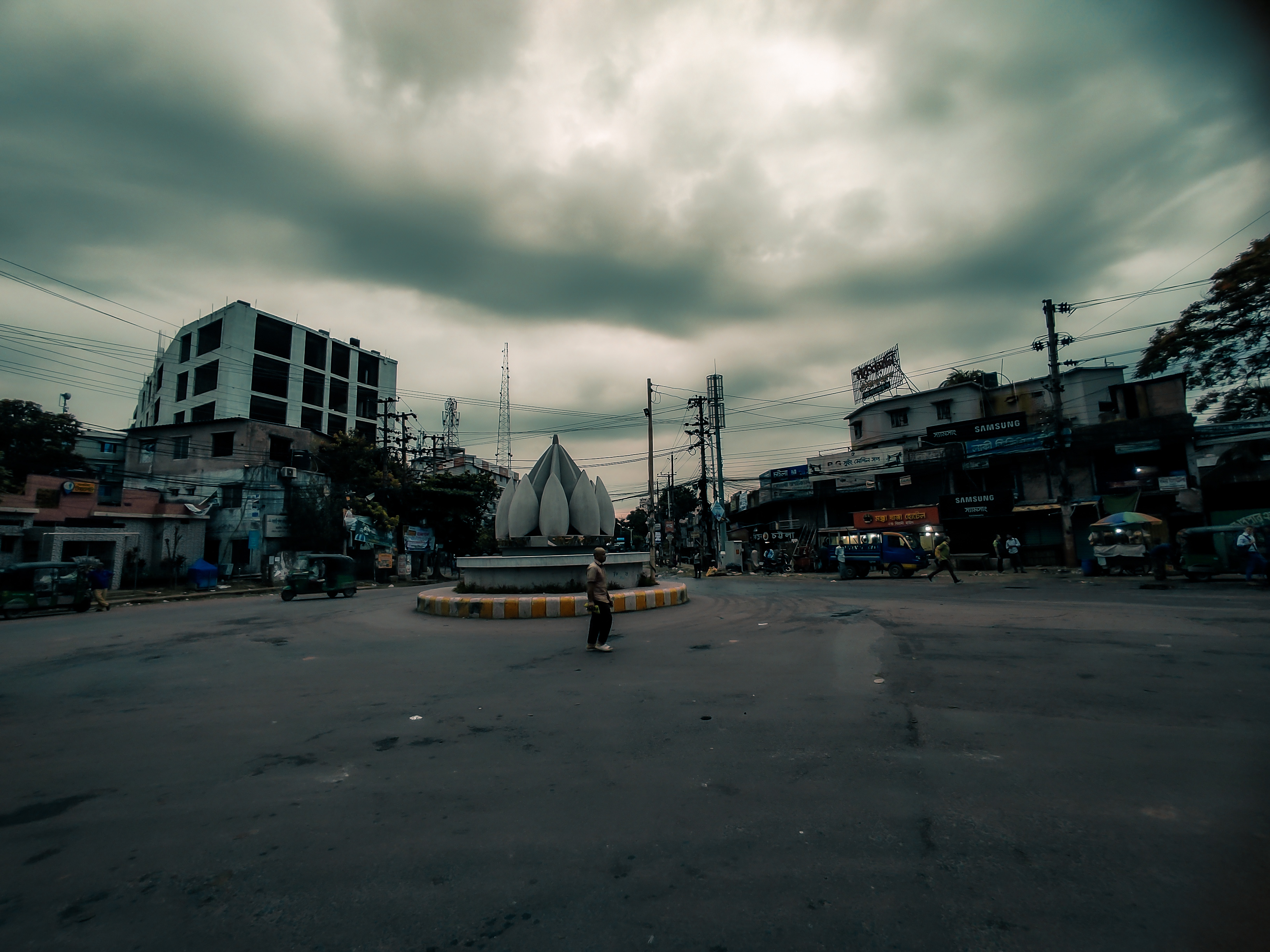
Oxygen Square

Oxygen Square (Bengali: অক্সিজেন মোড়) is a place in Chittagong, Bangladesh. It is an urban square under Bayazid Thana.

It is located in Jalalabad Ward of Chittagong City Corporation. It is one of the two road entrances to the city. As there is no bus terminal in the city, all the buses and passenger vehicles stop at this place for the passengers causing severe traffic jam. Oxygen Square is the busiest area of the metropolis. The "Satata Bus" run for students in the city plies from this place to Tigerpass by the Bangladesh Road Transport Corporation. Bangabandhu Avenue in Chittagong extends from Oxygen Square to Kuais. This place is essential for road communication in the northern part of Chittagong District. The only highway to Rangamati is N106 which is accessed from Oxygen Square. The distance from here to Muradpur Circle is 3km. On 27 February 2022, the city authority decided to rename the Oxygen Square as Gausul Azam Maizbhandari Square after Ahmad Ullah Maizbhandari.
