= White Noise (band) =

Experimental electronic music band

- Origin: Billingham, England
- Genres: Electronic; experimental; acid rock
- Years active: 1968–present
- Labels: Island; Pulse; Virgin; AMP
- Members: David Vorhaus; Mike Painter
- Past members: Annie Bird; Delia Derbyshire; Brian Hodgson; Mark Jenkins; Paul Lytton; Val Shaw; John Whitman

White Noise are an English experimental electronic music band formed in London in 1968, after the American-born David Vorhaus, a classical bass player with a background in physics and electronic engineering, attended a lecture by Delia Derbyshire, a sound scientist at the BBC Radiophonic Workshop. Derbyshire and Brian Hodgson, then both former members of electronic music project Unit Delta Plus, joined Vorhaus to form the band.

== Biography ==
=== An Electric Storm ===
In June 1969, White Noise released the groundbreaking album An Electric Storm on Island Records. The album was created using a variety of tape manipulation techniques, and used the first British synthesizer, the EMS Synthi VCS3. Amongst many oddities, the first track on the album, "Love Without Sound", employed sped-up tape edits of Vorhaus playing the double bass to create violin and cello sounds. Although not initially commercially successful for Island, the album is now considered an important and influential album in the development of electronic music, namechecked by artists like The Orb and Julian Cope, influencing contemporary acts such as Broadcast, Add N to (X), and Secret Chiefs 3. Peter Kember of Spacemen 3 included "Firebird" on his 2004 curated compilation Spacelines.

=== White Noise 2-III-IV-V ===
Following the departure of Derbyshire and Hodgson to pursue other projects, Vorhaus released a second album, the largely instrumental White Noise 2 - Concerto for Synthesizer on Virgin Records in 1974. It was recorded in his own studio in Camden, North London. The album further utilized the EMS VCS 3, as well as prototype sequencers. A third album, the single track 'space fantasy' White Noise III - Re-Entry was released by Pulse Records in 1980. A further two albums were released, the atmospheric White Noise IV - Inferno (AMP Music) (1990) incorporated the use of samples, and White Noise V - Sound Mind (AMP Music; 2000), an experiment in what Vorhaus called "dark ambient".

It means I won't be getting on Top of the Pops, but I felt the category was broad enough that I could redefine it in ways that I couldn't redefine other genres, such as country and western - much as I'd like to! There's a lot of scope for experimentation and on one track, "Dark Matter", anything that is recognisable is out - no harmony, no pitch, no rhythm. It's so dark, you can't even see the stars.

=== Painter joins (2011–present) ===
In 2011, Vorhaus enlisted Mike Painter and toured as White Noise. In a 2015 interview with The Quietus, Vorhaus stated his continued interest in experimentation with modern technology, saying there are less limits than there used to be.

To mark the fiftieth anniversary of An Electric Storm, a new album Lightning Strikes Twice was released in 2021. The album featured Vorhaus and Painter, both using MANIAC (Multiphasic ANalog Inter‑Active Cromataphonic, or software simulation of it), Vorhaus on the Kaleidophon (his string instrument invention using ribbon controllers) and Painter using a virtual reality glove.

== Side projects ==
From the 1980s, Vorhaus has made electronic library music recordings for KPM Music and De Wolfe Music using Fairlight CMI. Vorhaus has written music for TV and film and his music features on TV commercials and TV themes. His recordings include:

- Standard Music Library: Electronic Music (Standard Music Library, 1969 with Delia Derbyshire and Brian Hodgson)
- The Vorhaus Sound Experiments (KPM Music, 1980)
- Sleight of Mind (KPM Music, 1982)
- Electro-graphics (Music De Wolfe, 1982 with Dave Bradnum)
- Sound Conjurer (KPM Music, 1983 with Dave Bradnum)
- The Quest (Music De Wolfe, 1984 with Dave Bradnum)
- Out of the Dark (KPM Music, 1985)
- Real or Unreal (KPM Music, 1989)
- Atmos 6. Water/New Age (Carlin Production Music, 1991)
- Virtual World (KPM Music, 1993)
- Science Fricktion (Music House, 2000)

== Members ==
=== Current ===
- David Vorhaus (1968–present)
- Mike Painter (2011–present)

=== Former ===
- Delia Derbyshire (1968–1969)
- Brian Hodgson (1968–1969)
- Paul Lytton (1968–1969)
- John Whitman (1968–1969)
- Annie Bird (1968–1969)
- Val Shaw (1968–1969)
- Mark Jenkins (2005–2011)

== Discography ==
- An Electric Storm (1969)
- White Noise 2 - Concerto for Synthesizer (1974)
- White Noise 3 - Re-Entry (1980)
- White Noise 4 - Inferno (1990)
- White Noise 5 - Sound Mind (2000)
- White Noise 5.5 - White Label (2006)
- Lightning Strikes Twice (2021)
