= Rocky Mount Instruments =

Subsidiary of the Allen Organ Company

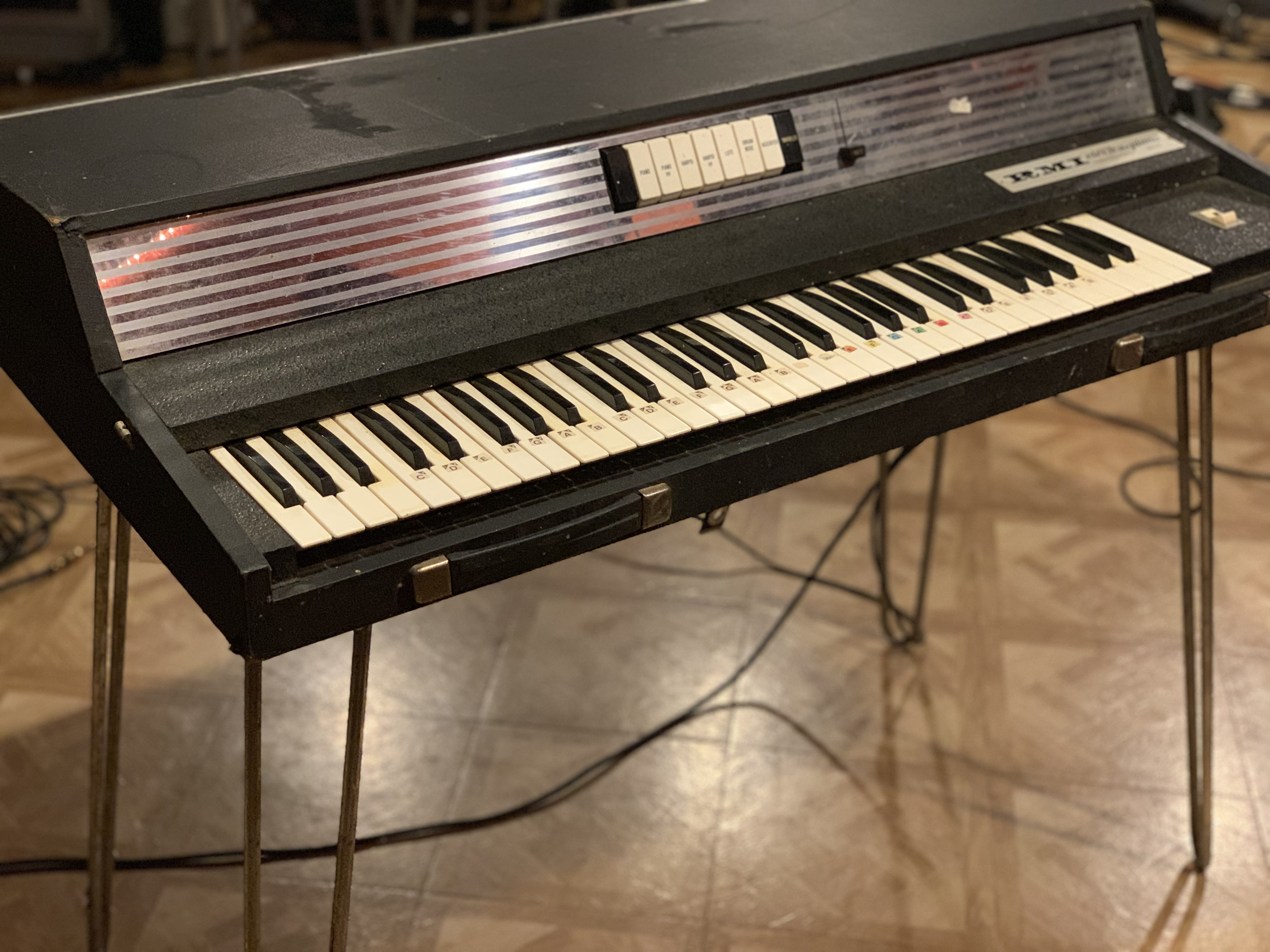
- The RMI 300B Electra-piano
- Type: Subsidiary
- Founded: 1966; 60 years ago
- Defunct: 1982
- Products: Electronic pianos, synthesizers
- Parent: Allen Organ Company

Rocky Mount Instruments (RMI) was a subsidiary of the Allen Organ Company, based in Rocky Mount, North Carolina, active from 1966 to 1982. The company was formed to produce portable musical instruments, and manufactured several electronic pianos, harpsichords, and organs that used oscillators to create sound, instead of mechanical components like an electric piano.

The first significant instrument produced by RMI was the Rock-Si-Chord, which emulated a harpsichord. The best-selling and most widely used instrument was the RMI Electra-piano, that was played by numerous artists in the late 1960s and early 1970s, including Todd Rundgren, Steve Winwood, Genesis' Tony Banks, and Yes' Rick Wakeman. Later, the company became a pioneer of digital synthesizers, including the Keyboard Computer and RMI Harmonic Synthesizer; both were used by Jean Michel Jarre. The company struggled to compete with digital synthesizers in the early 1980s, which led to its closure. A number of sample libraries featuring RMI instruments are available for modern digital keyboards.

== Early models ==
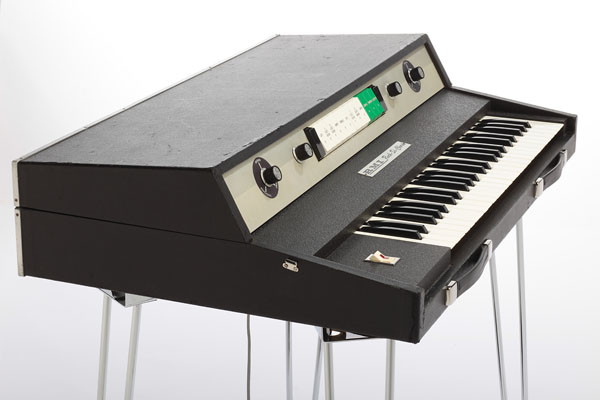
The Rock-Si-Chord preceded RMI's best-known Electra-piano.

The origins of RMI date to 1959, when Allen started using transistors in their organs instead of vacuum tubes. A separate division was set up to see if this technology could be used for portable musical instruments. A patent was filed in 1963 on the group's electronic keyboard design. Most models were designed at the company headquarters in Pennsylvania and manufactured in Rocky Mount, North Carolina, which led to the sub-division's name, Rocky Mount Instruments. Production started off in part of a former tobacco warehouse, before moving to a 60,000-square-foot (5,600 m^{2}) factory employing 100 staff.

The first models produced were combo organs in early 1967. The Explorer cost $845 and was a four-octave instrument that had a dedicated oscillator for each key, and was fitted with a "flying hammer" mechanism that repeatedly made or broke the oscillator's electrical connection, giving a strumming sound like a banjo or mandolin. The Lark was a three-octave organ which shared an oscillator between every two notes. (Note: The sharing of oscillators made it impossible to play the respective two notes (eg: C and C♯) at the same time.) Other instruments included the "Band Organ" (a three-octave electrical imitation of a calliope), manufactured from 1968 to 1969.

The first electric piano model was the "Model 100 Rock-Si-Chord" in 1967. Retailing for $695, it contained two sounds (string and lute) but was later updated as the "Model 100A" which contained additional sounds (harpsichord, cembalo, lute, and two guitars). The "Model 200 Rock-Si-Chord" cost $995 and added an additional 4' voice, which required an additional set of tone generator boards for each key. Allen's Tom Emerick later said the Rock-Si-Chord was manufactured first because harpsichord voices were easier to design and manufacture than piano ones. The Rock-Si-Chord was discontinued in 1968.

RMI had no experience in the rock and pop market, as Allen had been used to selling instruments to churches and theatres. They produced advertisements featuring a mascot, "Gopher Baroque" and described the instrument in typical slang of the era, such as "I mean, you start swinging this axe and plastic things like crumble."

== Electra-pianos ==
Promenade
Mussorgsky, "Promenade" from Pictures at an Exhibition played on an Electra-piano 368X

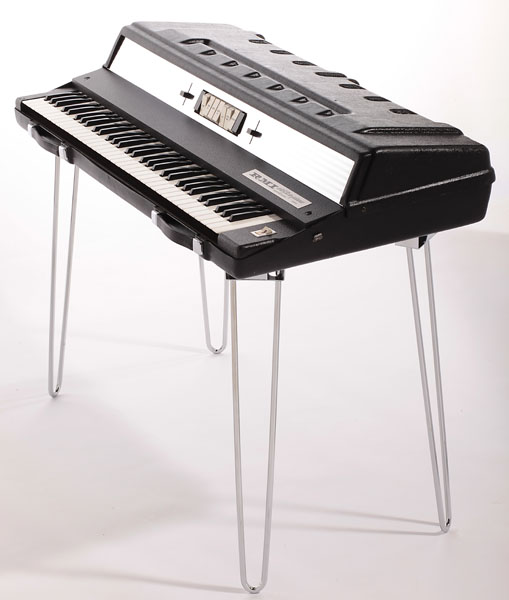
The RMI 368X with a black textured plastic case is the best-known Electra-piano

RMI began producing the 300 Series Electra-piano in 1967. As with earlier instruments, the Electra-piano featured an oscillator for each key. It uses an LC oscillator to generate the sound, as it produced a stable frequency that was not prone to drift. The signal is then run through a series of filters in order to produce an envelope resembling that of a piano. The Electra-piano also had an "organ mode" that allowed each note to sustain indefinitely instead of decay like a piano, and an "accenter" that added a percussion effect to the start of each note being played.

The original 300A (1967) and B (1969) models had 61 keys (G to C). The 368 was introduced in 1972 and added seven additional notes at the top end. It was the best-selling Electra-piano. The 368X (1974) was a 368 housed in a molded plastic case instead of the previously used tolex-covered plywood. The 68D was a touch sensitive version of the 368X; it was made to order and few were produced.

The Model 400 was a console version of the 300, which was intended for the home and club market and included a self-contained speaker system. The 400A (1970) used the same internals as the 300B, adding a 50 watt amplifier. The 468 (1972) was based on the 368.

The 600 series combined the sounds of the Electra-piano and the Rock-Si-Chord. The first model was the 600A (1968). It included 8' and 4' tabs, which required two oscillators for every key and a separate bank of filters for each footage. The 600B (1970) featured an improved voicing circuitry and a pedal board with two volume and two sustain pedals. The 668 and 668X were the equivalents to the 368 and 368X respectively. The 668X weighed 100 pounds (45 kg) and cost $2,095. It was the last analog Electra-piano remaining in production in the early 1980s.

The Electra-piano had a standard audio jack output, so it could be connected to any guitar or keyboard amplifier. However, RMI designed amps specifically for the instrument. The 140 came with a single 15-inch (380 mm) JBL woofer, while the 140A featured a pair of them, and both had a set of dual high-frequency drivers. An optional accessory was available that was particularly good at producing high frequencies, that sat on top of the amp and was nicknamed the "Hi-Scream Cone".

In total, around 10,000 RMI Electra-pianos were sold. However, unlike the Rhodes and Wurlitzer, RMI pianos have been reported as hard to find by collectors. Samples of RMI instruments are available for digital keyboards such as the Nord Stage. The Roland JV-series sound modules include a "Keyboards of the '60s and '70s" library, which includes a series of RMI samples programmed by Nick Magnus.

== Other products ==
In 1974, RMI produced the "Keyboard Computer". It was derived from the digital Allen Computer Organ, with fewer voices, and was marketed as the world's first portable digital musical instrument. It cost $4,495 and supported transposition, pitch bend, and upgradeable voices via a series of punch cards. It was possible for the end user to store their own patches on punch cards. Though marketed as a synthesizer, the Keyboard Computer was based more on organ technology and did not have the full set of synthesizer functions. The Keyboard Computer II was introduced in 1977. It cost $4,750 and featured an improved user interface, an increased range of voices, and allowed users to store more patches.

In 1975, RMI produced its only true synthesizer, the $2,995 RMI Harmonic Synthesizer. It is one of the first digital synthesizers to be commercially produced, pre-dating the better-known Yamaha DX7 by almost a decade. It featured 48 keys and two digital harmonic generators, each supporting sixteen different sets, and was equipped with a voltage-controlled filter and octave shifter. Other features included pitch bend, portamento, and controls for amplitude and frequency modulation. Though it was technically advanced, it did not sell well and was discontinued in 1976. Around 150 to 250 units were produced and only four were ever sold in Europe.

The DK-20 (Digital Keyboard) was released in 1979 as a replacement for the analog Electra-pianos. It featured 68 keys and was housed in a similar cabinet to earlier instruments. Effects included adjustable decay, a phaser, and various filters. This model was produced until 1982.

By the early 1980s, RMI was in decline owing to the high price of its instruments and competition from polyphonic synthesizers like the Prophet 5 and Oberheim OB-X. The company ceased production in 1982.

== Notable users ==
The Rock-Si-Chord quickly became popular and was used by the Beach Boys, the Lovin' Spoonful, Quasi, Sun Ra, and Garth Hudson of The Band. The Electra-piano was widely used by rock musicians in the late 1960s and early 1970s, including Deep Purple's Jon Lord, Todd Rundgren, Frank Zappa, Rick Wakeman with Yes, and in his solo albums, Tony Banks with Genesis, Ron Mael with Sparks, Nicky Hopkins, Stevie Wonder, and Elton John. Steve Winwood played an Electra-piano solo on John Barleycorn Must Die's "Empty Pages". Dr. John played an RMI on "Right Place, Wrong Time".

Lord transplanted the internals of an RMI into a Hammond organ and allowed it to be triggered from the Hammond's manuals. Banks later said he used the RMI as it was the best possible onstage alternative to a piano at the time, but disliked the lack of touch sensitivity and fewer notes than a grand piano. Owing to a lack of polyphonic synthesizers, he ran the RMI through effects pedals in order to create new sounds. The RMI was used for live renditions of songs that had a piano on the studio version, such as "Firth of Fifth" and "The Lamb Lies Down on Broadway". He eventually replaced the RMI with a Yamaha CP-70.

The RMI Keyboard Computer was used by Isaac Hayes, Wakeman, Roger Powell of Utopia, the Band's Garth Hudson, the Moody Blues' Mike Pinder, and The Enid's Robert John Godfrey. It was also used together with the RMI Harmonic Synthesizer by Jean Michel Jarre on Oxygène (1976). Subsequently, it has been used by Aphex Twin, who listed it under the instrument credits for Syro (2014).
