= Revox =

Audio equipment brand

ReVox corporate logo

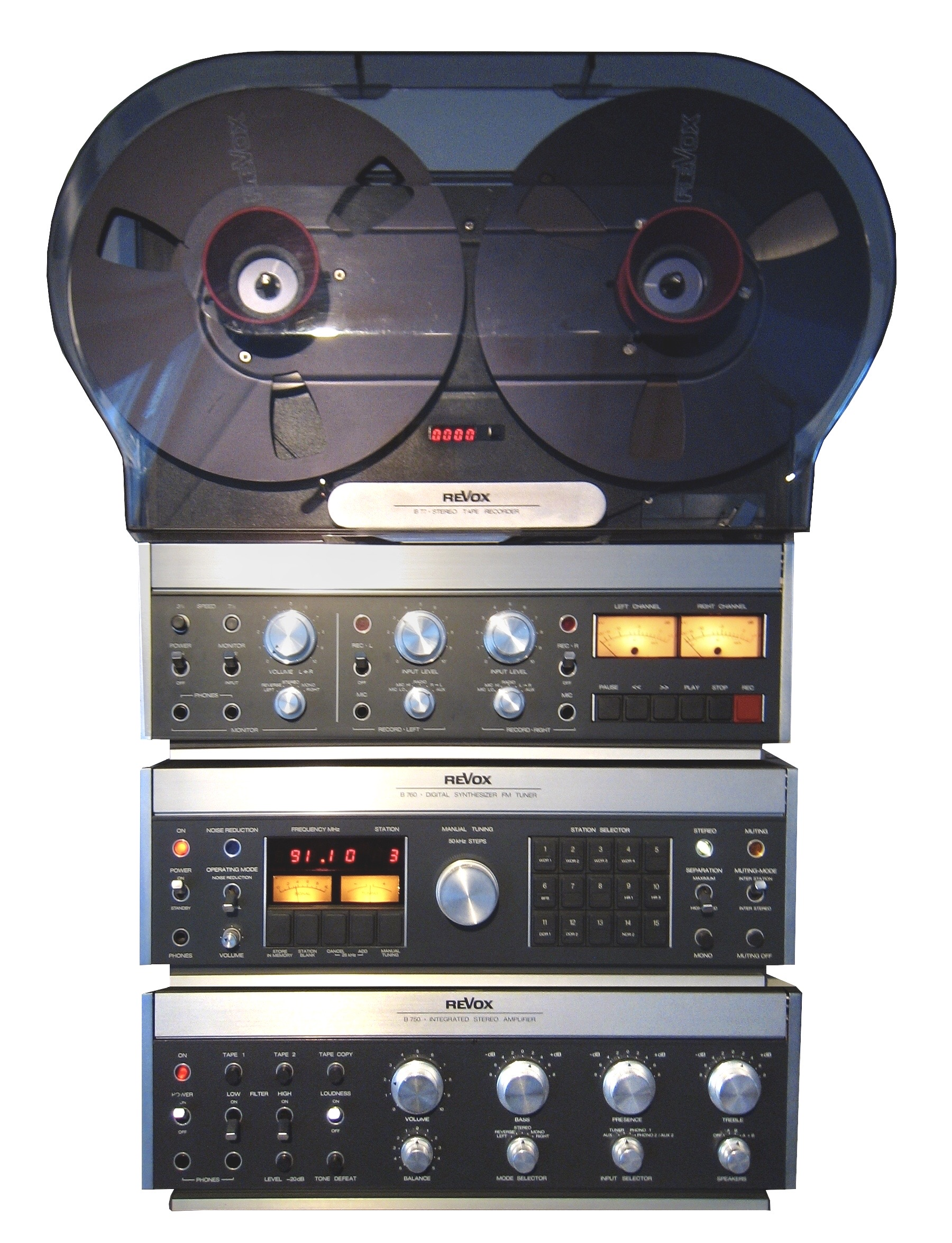
Complete Hi-Fi system from 1977 with audio amplifier A750, synthesizer tuner B760 (middle) and reel to reel audio tape recorder B77 (top).

ReVox (on-logo styling REVOX) is a brand name, registered by Studer on 27 March 1951 for Swiss audio equipment.

== History ==
The first Studer-designed tape recorders were branded Dynavox. After the first production series of Dynavox recorders, a new marketing company was formed in 1950 called ELA AG. Revox was adopted as the brand name for amateur recorders, while the professional machines retained the Studer name.

The first Revox-branded tape recorder was the T26, in 1952, successor to the Dynavox 100.

The T26 was also made available as a radio-recorder combination unit. 2500 T26 recorders were made, priced at 1395.00 Swiss francs.

The A36, the first 36 series recorder. became available in 1954. Unusual features for the time were pushbutton solenoid transport operations and a direct-drive capstan with no belts or idler wheels. The B36 of 1956 was the first 3-head model, the D36 of 1960 was the first stereo model.

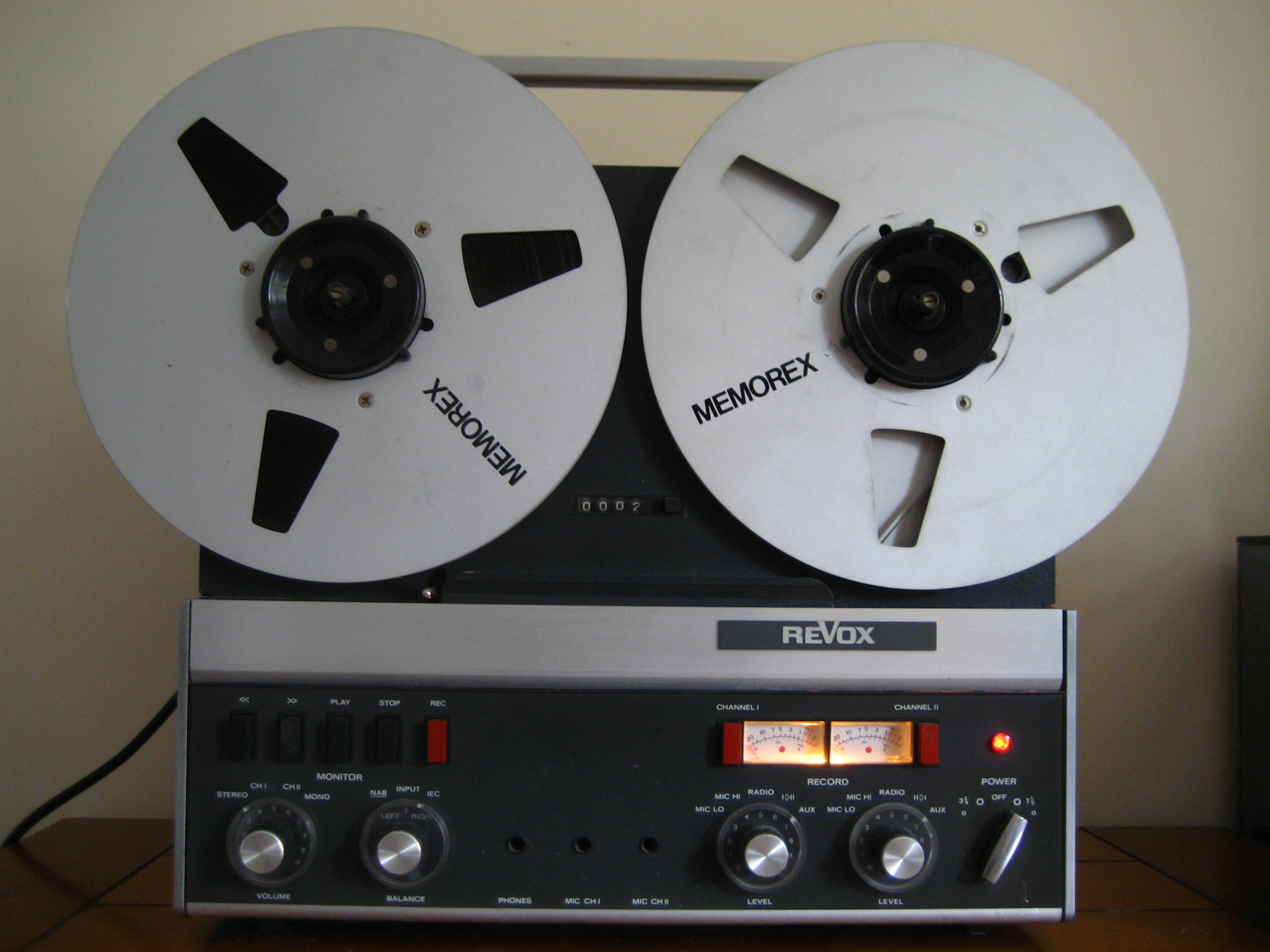
Revox A77 (1967–1977)

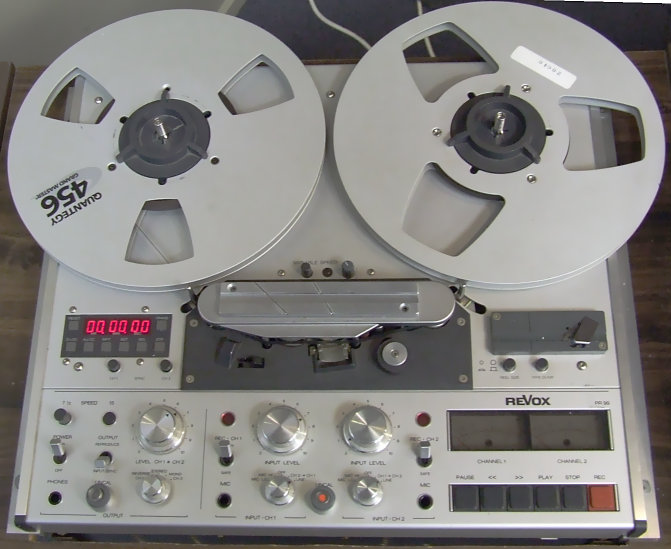
Revox PR99 Mk II, a 1/4 inch tape recorder. Produced from about 1985.

The company moved to Löffingen and Bonndorf, West Germany, in 1966, due to labour issues in Switzerland. But the building of a second factory was started in Regensdorf, Switzerland in 1967 - to open in 1968.

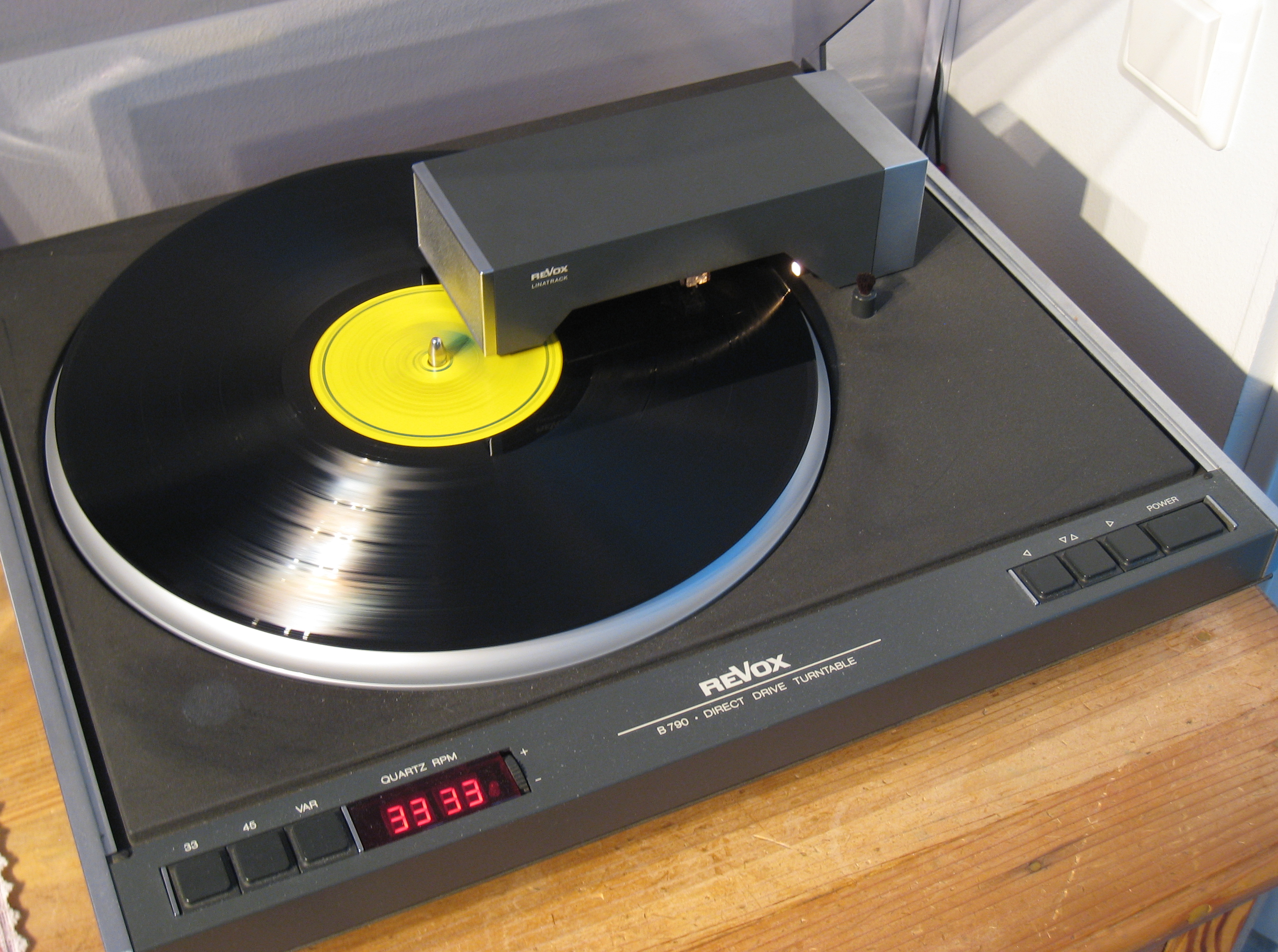
Revox B790 Linear tracking record player (1977–1982)

In 1967 the 36-series tape recorders ended with the G36, and were superseded by the transistorised A77 with a servo-controlled direct drive capstan. Over 80,000 36-series recorders had been manufactured. The A77, of which more than 460,000 were built, was complemented by an integrated amplifier (A78) and FM tuner (A76). The start of the 1980s saw the introduction of the "B7xx" series of high fidelity components, which was in turn replaced by the B2xx series in the mid 1980s. The B2xx series was versatile (the B250 amplifier offering 10 signal inputs, each with automatic sensitivity calibration) and feature-rich, all components containing microprocessors. Contrastingly, the "H" line, with "H" standing for Human, went to the opposite extreme, with minimalist control interfaces: several "H" components having only three buttons.

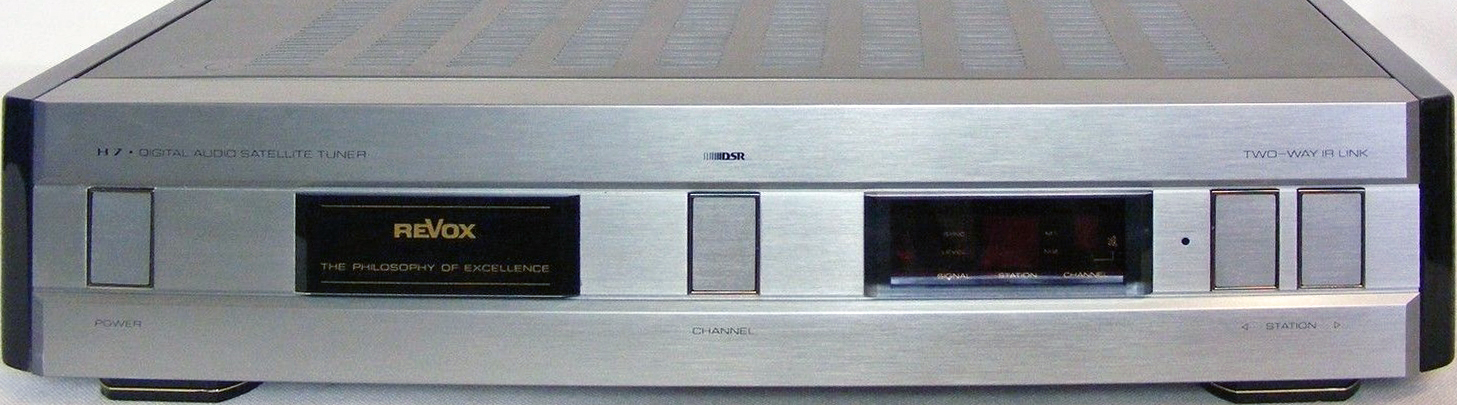
Revox H7, Digital-Tuner of H-series

In 1990 Willi Studer sold the Studer Revox Group to the Swiss company Motor-Columbus AG, including all subsidiary companies. In 1991, Motor-Columbus split the Studer Revox Group into Studer (Pro), Revox (HiFi) and a manufacturing-division. Motor-Columbus sold several subsidiaries and plants.

The extensive reorganization culminated in the sale of the Studer Group to Harman International Inc., in March 1994. The Revox Group was excluded and sold to private investors. On 17 March 1994 Harman International Industries completed its acquisition and acquired from Motor-Columbus AG 100% of Studer Revox AG. Harman paid 100 Swiss Francs (approximately US $70.00) for all of the issued and outstanding stock in Studer Revox. Harman assumed post-acquisition indebtedness of Studer Revox of approximately 23 million Swiss Francs (approximately US $16 million).

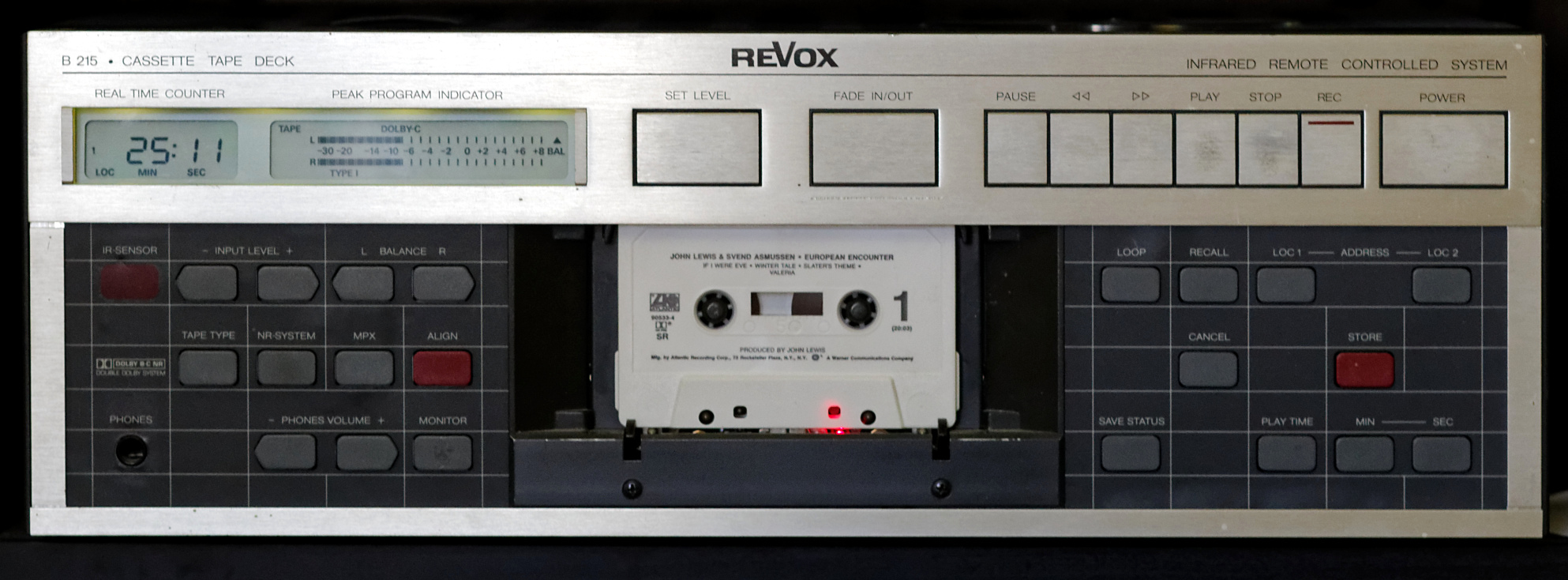
Revox B 215, 4-motors-Cassettedeck without belts (1985-1992)

The founder of Revox, Willi Studer, died on 1 March 1996.

The company logo is the word "REVOX" in capitals, with a "V" larger than the other letters; When printed in fixed-size type, the mixed-case spelling "ReVox" is sometimes used, but in all older and most newer references the name is shown as "Revox".

Many consider ReVox open-reel tape recorders to be high-end audio equipment. The most famous of these are the G36 (valve type), A77 (solid state with relay controls) and B77 (solid state with logic control and direct-drive). The A700 was the top-of-the-line 1970s machine with 3-speed quartz PLL capstan, or, like the B77 which appeared in 1979, variable tape speed from 2.5 to 22.5 inches per second. Pictured to the right is the PR99 Mk2, a variant of the B77 for professional users, differing from the B77 in having balanced line in/out, and a real-time counter and auto-locator. The PR99 series was superseded by the C270 series, available also in multi-track formats (C274, C278).

Robert Fripp used Revox machines to produce his Frippertronics recordings in the late 1970s onward, until he replaced the recorders with digital delays in the 1990s.

=== Cassette recorders, CD players, televisions ===
Revox also produced cassette tape recorders, notably the B710 and later the B215, which used the same transport and substantially the same electronics as the more expensive Studer A710 and Studer A721, respectively. It is worth noting that the Revox H11 and C115 cassette recorders are not true Revox or Studer products, but rebadged Philips Model FC60. As such, they do not meet the performance standards of the B710, B215 and H1 which are Studer designed and built.

In the same fashion, the Revox B225 and B226 compact disc players were very heavily based on the Studer A725 and A727 professional CD players. Likewise, the Revox FM tuners were almost identical to the Studer professional models. A limited run of the B226 CD player was issued to celebrate Studer's 40th anniversary. Dubbed 'The Signature', it featured a black faceplate (in contrast to the then silver (anodized aluminium) B226) and used the high performance Silver Crown version of the Philips TDA1541 DAC, which later featured in non-Signature B226-S versions.

Revox was one of the first manufacturers to market a plasma television set, the model E542 in 1999. Before that, they commissioned Loewe to manufacture a limited number of models of S-VHS and VHS video cassette recorders and CRT television sets branded with the Revox name. A DVD player bearing the Revox name (model S27) was built by the French company Micromega.

== Current technology ==
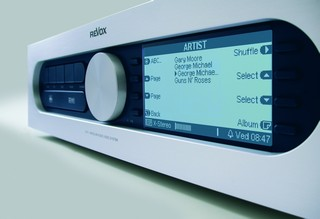
modular multiroom system M51

In 2002, Revox introduced with the Re:system M51 a modular audio video system in the market. This system can provide up to 32 rooms in 4 different listening zones with music. Different modules allow the user to select which sources he would like to use in his home, available sources (modules) for the M51 and M10 are amongst others FM-tuner, SAT-radio, Internet-radio, Multiroom, Audio server and also Audio streams. Solutions are available for all imaginable application possibilities up to the control via Apple products with the corresponding Apps. The operation of Multiroom require the availability of the corresponding Multiroom module and small amplifiers of the type M219 in the remote rooms. Also the first audio server of the company, the Revox M57, was perfectly in line with the Multiroom concept.

The M51 MKII is available with two different amplifiers. The analogue version performs 5 x 60 Watt sinus, the digital Class-D-amplifier 5 x 200 Watt sinus.

The M-series was extended in 2006 by the M10, a 19“ rack solution as central nerve and source centre and in 2010 by the M100, an audiophile Hifi-stereo amplifier with 2 x 200 Watt sinus power, FM-tuner and DVD-drive in an extremely compact housing. For the models M10 and M51, the latter is currently available in version MKII, the insertable modules are identical. For the M100 the modules, except for Multiroom, are offered as pluggable supplementations to the basic model.

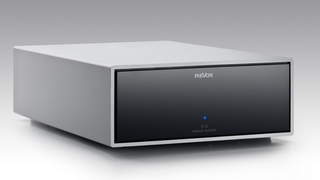
network receiver Joy S119 (since 2012)

In the Multiroom operation the control of the rooms is effected by wall control units of the type M217/M218, by the remote controls M207 or M208 or by Apps, which are momentarily only available for the iOS-operating system.

In addition to the pure Audio server M37 MKII the Multimedia server M117 was introduced in 2011. In 2012 Revox presented the new audiophile network receivers Revox Joy S120, S119 and S118.

The workmanship of the devices is typically for Revox on a very high level and is characterised by the selection of precious materials like aluminium and glass.

At the begin of 2020 Revox surprised with a new belt-driven turntable Studiomaster T700, which has a tone arm made of carbon fiber and a built in MC-Pre-amplifier. It is delivered with an Ortofon Quintet Bronze pick up.

== Reel to reel revived ==
As of May 2016, Revox announced the re-introduction of a reel-to-reel tape player, to be released in the first quarter of 2017. Manufactured and developed in conjunction with HORCH HOUSE (a division of Lutz Precision k.s.), it will initially be a playback-only machine, with a recorder/reproducer to follow. In 2024, ReVox announced the birth of a brand new tape recorder, based on the historical success of the B77 line, the new B77 MK3. A top notch audiophile tape recorder for audiophile home use.

== Loudspeakers ==
For more than 40 years, Revox has been producing loudspeakers. The first speaker of the brand Revox was the series 46 (1970), which was developed for the former HiFi system A77, A76 and A50. The AX- (1976), the BX- (1977) and the BR-series (1980) followed. All speakers were developed and manufactured in the Revox plant in Ewattingen / Black Forest.

Numerous other speakers went along with the company in the 1980s. The most famous speakers were the Symbol B (1983) as well as the first Revox active speaker Agora B (1986). A milestone in the speaker development was the two digital active speakers Scala 4.7 (1994) and Scala 3.6 (1996). 1980 also saw the introduction of the Triton, one of the first sub-woofer / satellite systems for home high fidelity. The Triton subwoofer comprised a 200 lb cabinet designed to also act as a piece of furniture on which the entire B7xx series (including B77) could stand. The Triton system was superseded by the smaller and more compact Piccolo, and later the Power Cube, which was a Piccolo bass unit with built-in power amplifiers and optional remote control and multi-room controller.

In 1987, Revox acquired the rights to manufacture the Stereolith Duetto, a single-box stereo loudspeaker. Built in the shape of a triangular prism, the Duetto was designed to complement, in acoustics and appearance, the Piccolo bass unit (passive operation) or the Power Cube (active operation).

Revox's product range includes several types of speakers. speaker assortment. The range includes three-way speakers, such as the Prestige models of the Re:sound G and Re:sound S series, as well as medium, small, and installation speakers designed for uses including multi-room systems.
