= Eminent 310 Unique =

Home electronic organ

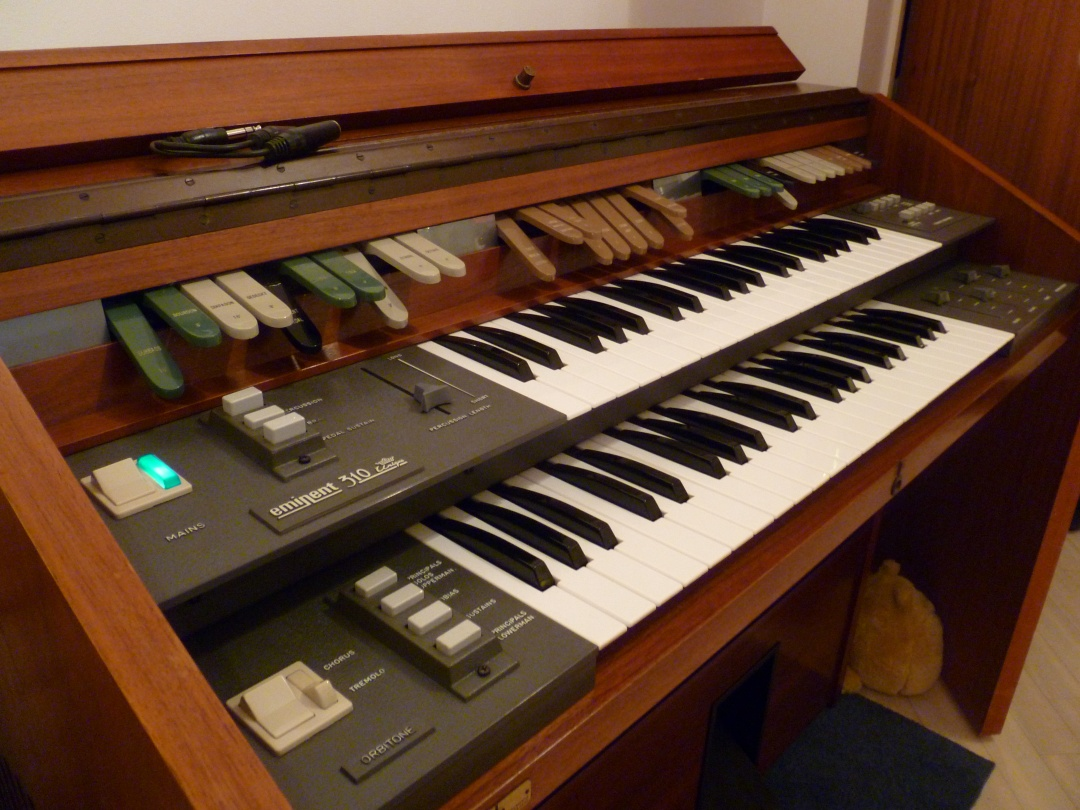
- Upper controls and manuals
- Manufacturer: Eminent Orgelbouw B.V.
- Dates: 1972–1983

Technical specifications
- Polyphony: Full polyphony
- Timbrality: Monotimbral per manual
- Oscillator: 12 discrete tone generators with octave divide-down
- Synthesis type: Analog additive (organ) and subtractive (strings)
- Filter: Band-pass (organ), bucket-brigade device delay lines (strings, chorus)
- Attenuator: Decay and release
- Effects: Chorus, reverb

Input/output
- Keyboard: 42 upper manual 44 lower manual 13 bass pedalboard

The Eminent 310 Unique is an analog electronic organ introduced in 1972 by the Dutch organ manufacturer Eminent, at the time based in Bodegraven, the Netherlands. It was the first organ to include a string section, making it the first commercial polyphonic string synthesizer on the market. A standalone unit originally targeted at the home market, it is prominently featured on the Jean-Michel Jarre albums Oxygène (1977) and Equinoxe (1978).

The technology for the string section was later released as its own standalone instrument, the Solina String Ensemble (rebadged by ARP as the ARP String Ensemble for the US market), which saw wide use in popular music.
