= Michel Granger =

French painter

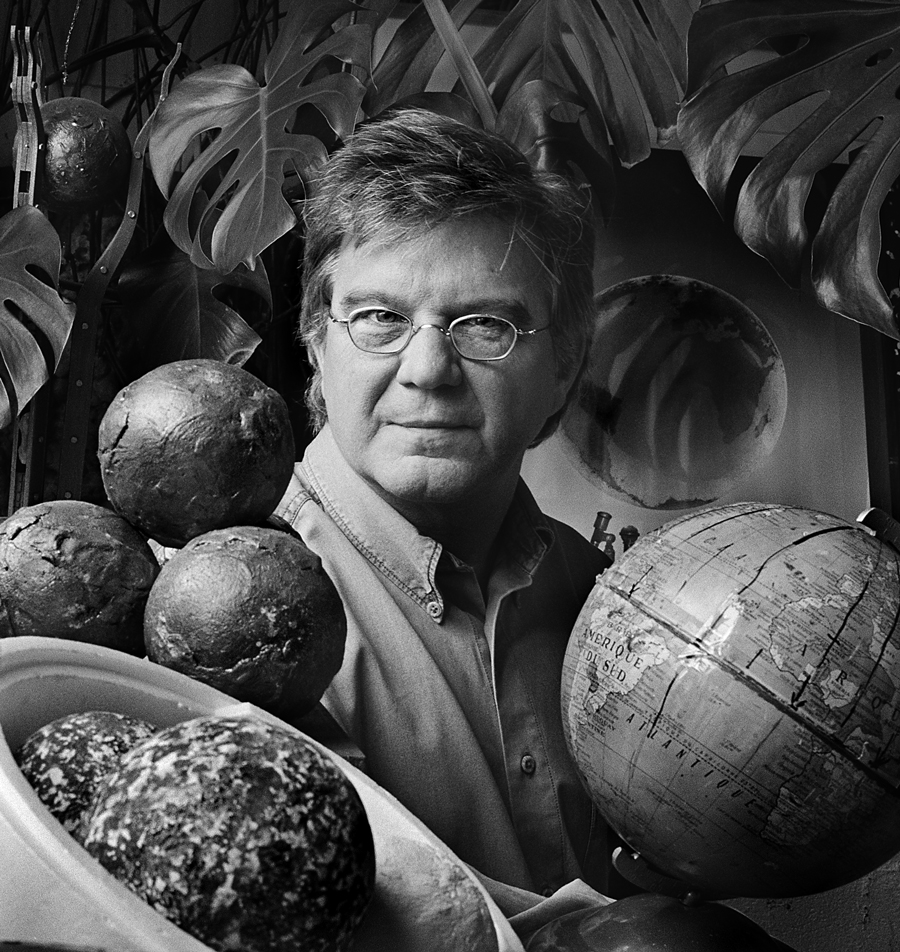
- Born: October 13, 1946 (age 79); Roanne, Rhône-Alpes, France
- Education: École nationale supérieure des beaux-arts de Lyon
- Website: www.michelgranger.fr

Michel Granger (French pronunciation: [miʃɛl ɡʁɑ̃ʒe]; born 13 October 1946) is a French painter, sculptor and visual artist.

== Biography ==
He spent his childhood in Arsenal County, a period that will strongly mark his artistic work. However, his encounters and successive travels took him to new horizons and far from his homeland: during the 1970s, his career became international.

Granger is known for his work associated with the musician Jean-Michel Jarre, and particularly with the work Oxygene, depicting a delaminated earth with a semi-exposed skull.

== Works ==
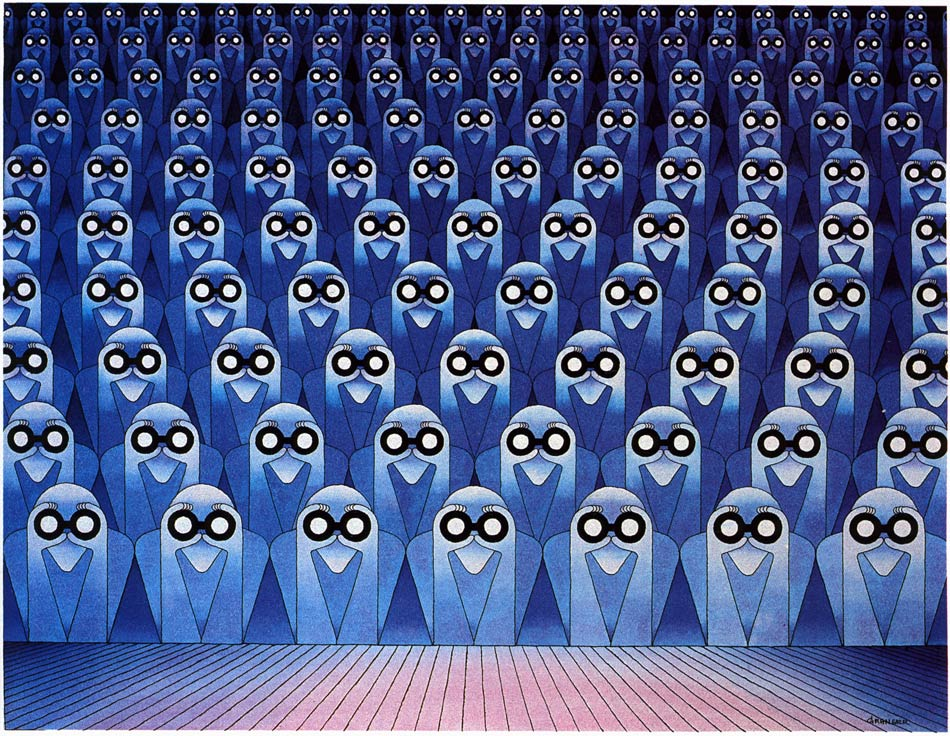
Painting Le Trac (English: Stage Fright)

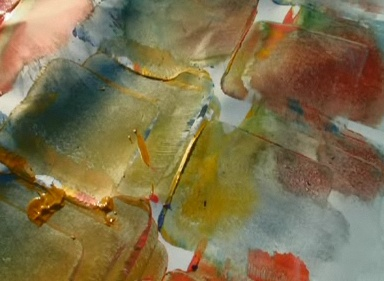
Painting Empreintes (English: Footprints)

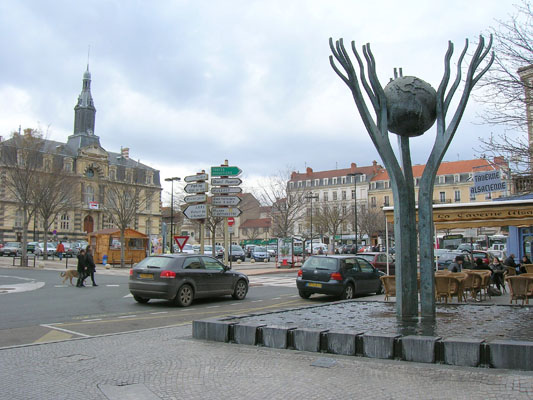
Sculpture in Roanne, France
