= Straube Piano Company =

American piano manufacturer

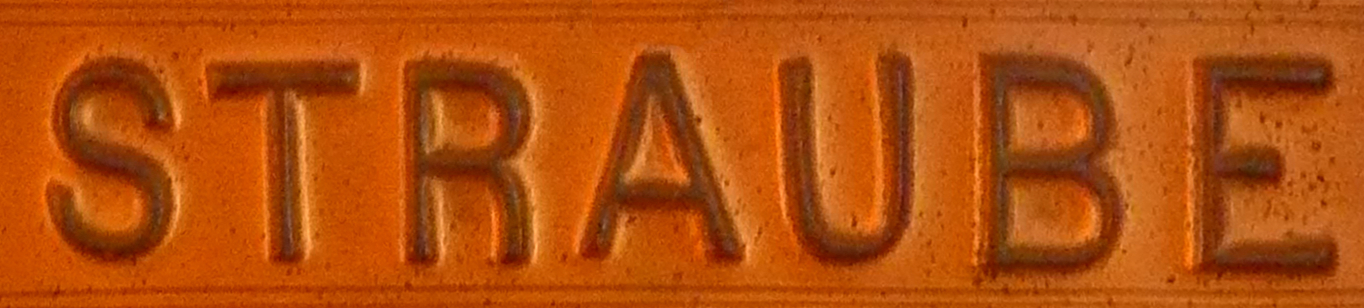
- Industry: Music
- Founded: 1895
- Founder: Williard Naramore Van Matre, Sr. William Straube
- Headquarters: Hammond, Indiana, Downers Grove, Illinois
- Area served: North America
- Products: Pianos

The Straube Piano Company (1895–1937) and its successor Straube Pianos Inc. (1937–1949) were American piano manufacturers of uprights, grands, players, and reproducing grands.

Straube was active during the golden age of piano making, roughly 1890 to 1920, when pianos had few competitors for home entertainment. The company's own golden era ran from about 1904 to 1935, when it flourished as an innovator in the player piano business and grew into a high-volume piano producer.

Straube executives and plant superintendents, particularly E.R. Jacobson (president) and William G. Betz (superintendent and inventor/innovator), held leadership roles in industry organizations. The company produced its best pianos under the Straube name, and its lower-priced pianos under the Hammond, Gilmore, and Woodward brands. All of the models were distributed in the US, and the player models internationally as well, particularly in Australia.

== History ==
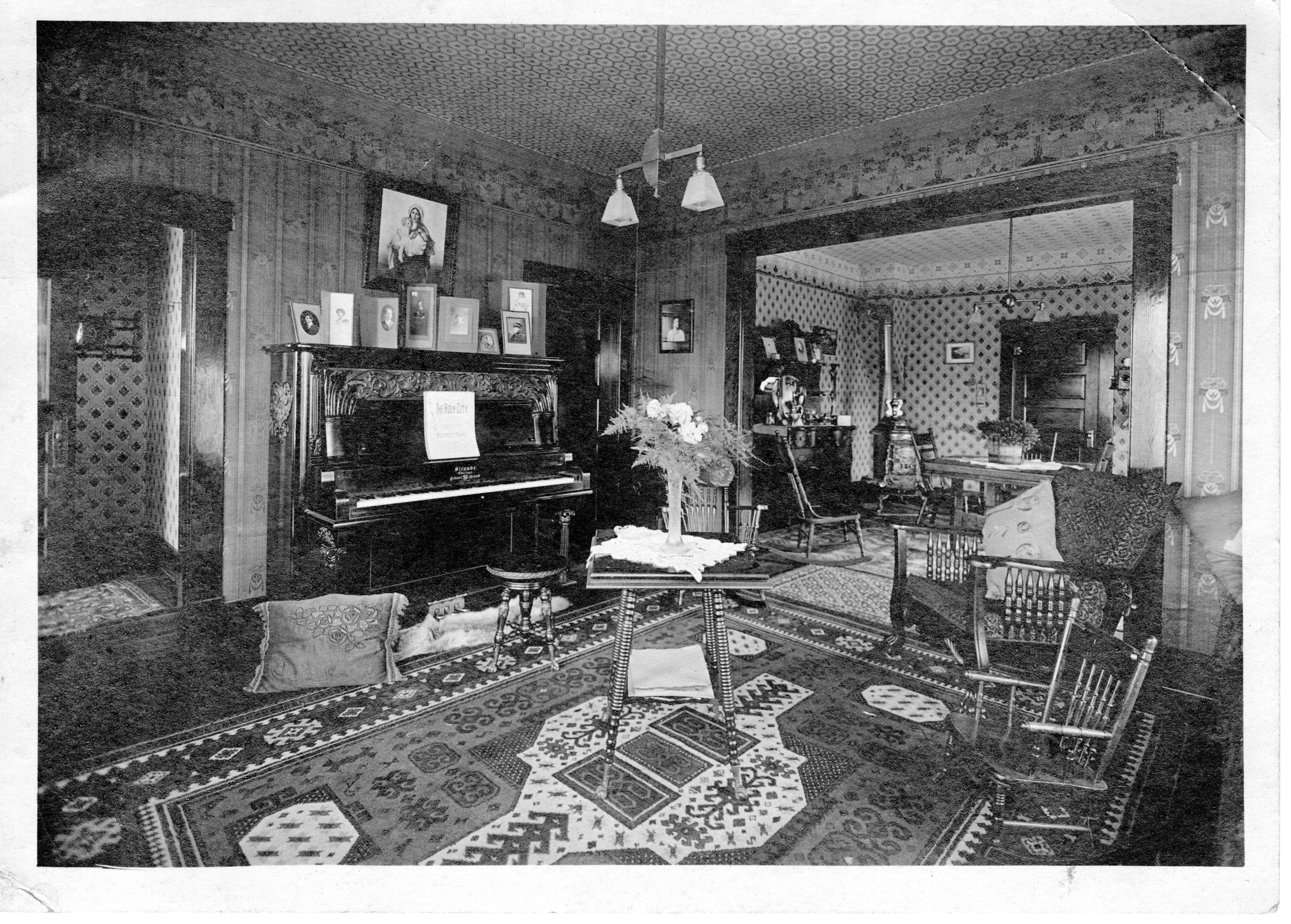
1901 Straube Cabinet Grand in a house (c. 1901, Bellingham, Washington)

=== 1890s: early years ===
The Straube Piano Company was the outgrowth of Van Matre & Straube (aka Straube & Van Matre), a partnership formalized in February 1895 by Williard Naramore Van Matre, Sr. (1851–1939), and William Straube (né Straub; (Note: "The Name of Straube" Archived 2022-01-08 at the Wayback Machine, Vol. 33, No. 8, August 24, 1901, pg. 12) 1857–1928).

That same month, Van Matre and Straube leased a factory together near Chicago at Downers Grove, Illinois, on the Chicago, Burlington and Quincy Railroad, (Note: "In The West: New Firm, Straube & Van Matre" Archived 2016-10-28 at the Wayback Machine, Vol. 20, No. 9, March 2, 1895, pg. 1) at the present intersection of Warren and Forest Avenues. Their original wareroom was at 24 Adams Street, Chicago. (Note: The Straube Piano Co.", Vol. 25, No. 23, December 4, 1897, pg. 23)

Straube's first piano was completed in June 1895 at that shared factory. (Note: "The Trade in Chicago" Archived 2017-09-26 at the Wayback Machine, Vol. 46, No. 11, pg. 51, March 14, 1908, pg. 51, col. 1) (Note: "Reorders for Straube Players", Vol. 50, No. 1, January 1, 1910, pg. 35) (Note: In 1906, W. N. Van Matre and M.F. Van Matre were directors of the Schumann Piano Co. W. N. Van Matre was president; Director of Directors in the City of Chicago, Audit Company of New York (1906), pg. 468) (W.N. Van Matre & Co. was a music dealer at 105 State Street in Rockford, Illinois.) Around July 1896, Straube purchased Van Matre's share in the business, and the partnership was dissolved. Straube continued in business under his own name. (Note: "In The West" Archived 2022-01-08 at the Wayback Machine, Vol 23, No. 3, August 8, 1896, pg. 1)

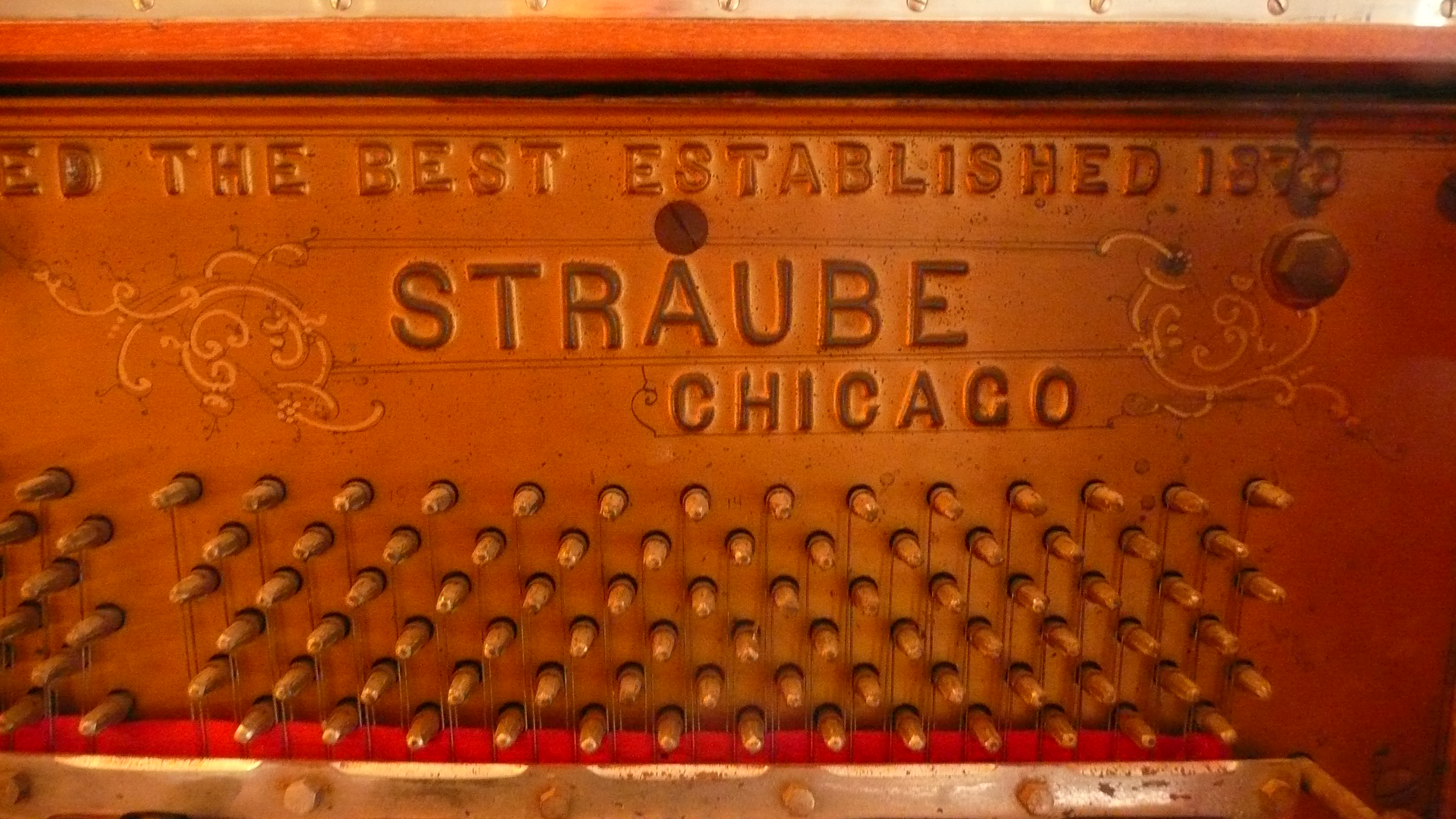
1901 Straube Cabinet Grand with an engraving "ESTABLISHED 1878".

Different founding years have been asserted for Straube's company. In 1907, Straube Piano Company executives publicly observed 1895 as their founding year. However, in 1911, Alfred Dolge published an influential reference book, Pianos and Their Makers, in which he gave 1878 as the founding year. The December 19, 1914, issue of Music Trade Review began using the 1878 founding date, (Note: "Who's Who in the Piano Industry" Archived 2022-01-08 at the Wayback Machine, Vol. 59, No. 25, December 19, 1914, pg. 18) and at some point Straube Piano began casting the numerals "1878" into the iron frames of their instruments. Straube Piano in 1924 cited 1879 as their founding year. In 1996, another author provided 1859 as the founding year.

William Straube (1857–1923), (Note: "William Straube Dies", Presto-Times, Issue 2205, November 3, 1928, pg. 9) who was an investor rather than a piano expert, incorporated Straube Piano Company in 1897 as an Illinois entity.

James (Jim) Francis Broderick (19 August 1854 Philadelphia – 17 November 1920 Chicago) became president on January 1, 1898, (Note: "James F. Broderick Has Passed Away Archived 2022-01-08 at the Wayback Machine", Presto, Issue 1791, November 20, 1920, pg. 11) and served in that role until March 1911. Before joining Straube Piano, Broderick had been a traveling salesman for Steger & Company and the B. Shoninger Co. (Note: "Broderick's New Move" Archived 2017-11-23 at the Wayback Machine, Vol. 25, No. 26, December 25, 1897, pg. 21)

=== 1900s ===
By 1901, William Straube had sold his interest and signed a 5-year non-compete agreement. (Note: "Straube Co. Get Injunction" Archived 2022-01-08 at the Wayback Machine, Vol. 18, No. 21, November 23, 1901, pg. 1) But in 1901, Straube, his two brothers, Herman Charles Straube (1867–1921) and Martin Straube, Jr. (1869–1934), and an associate, Charles Jacobsen (no relation to the Jacobsons of Straube Piano Company), formed another piano manufacturing company and leased the Club Block in Downers Grove. (Note: "Incorporation of Straube Bros." Archived 2017-11-24 at the Wayback Machine, Vol. 18, No. 2, July 13, 1901, pg. 28) The Straube Piano Company challenged and won an injunction on December 16, 1901, in Cook County Circuit Court forbidding the Straubes and Jacobsen from using the Straube name in the manufacturing of pianos. (Note: "Straube Piano Co. Win" Archived 2022-01-08 at the Wayback Machine, Vol. 33, No. 25, December 21, 1901, pg. 1)

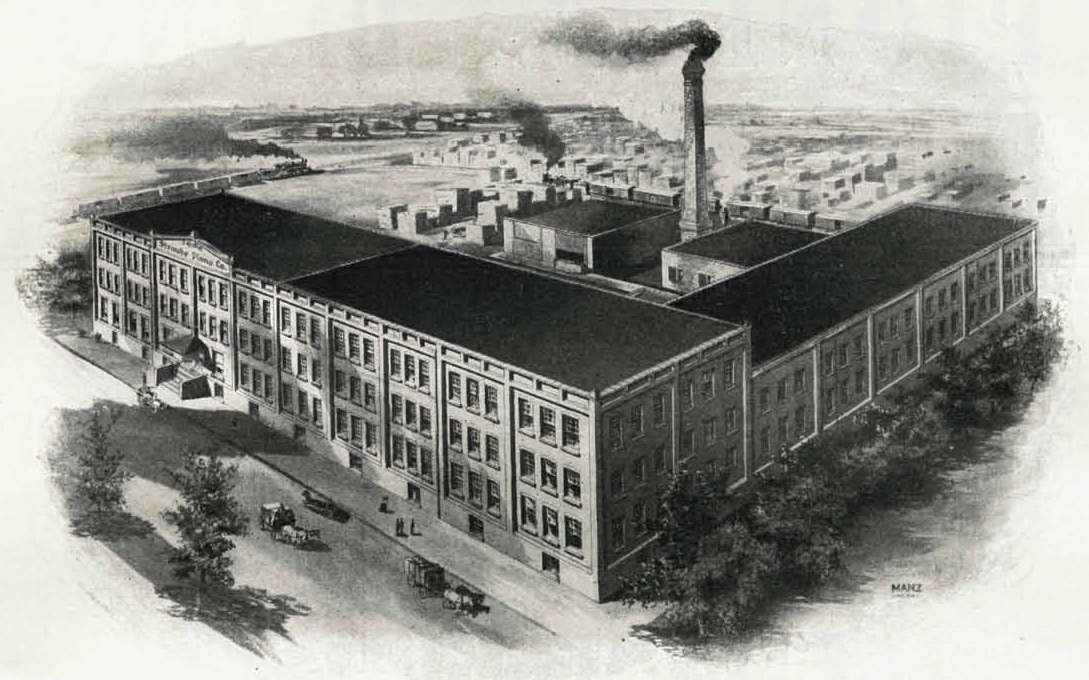
Straube Piano Factory, Hammond, Indiana, 1904 (Note: "The New Straube Factory Dedicated" Archived 2017-09-26 at the Wayback Machine, Vol. 39, No. 16, October 15, 1904, pps. 23 & 25)

In 1904, the Straube Piano Company moved its manufacturing and executive offices from Chicago to a custom-built factory in the city of Hammond in Indiana's Calumet Region. Sited on five acres served by both the Monon and the Chicago, Cincinnati & Louisville railways, the 3-story facility, with a basement, had 3,159 square metres (34,000 sq ft) of factory space. The exterior of the building was Oehlmacher brick, a light gray brick made in Michigan City, Indiana. The factory was of mill construction. The main structure was 160 by 50 feet, two stories high. The engine house was 50 by 35 feet, detached, and the boiler house was 60 by 45 feet and detached. The Monon dry kiln was 35 by 65 feet and held 20,000 feet of lumber. Equipped with automatic fire doors and fire walls, it had standpipes throughout the structure with separate hose attachments and concrete floors in the basement engine and boiler rooms. At full capacity, the new factory required 200 employees and could produce 3,000 finished pianos a year.

Straube Piano introduced its first player piano in November 1909.

The year 1909 was the peak of piano sales in the United States; sales totaled nearly 364,545 pianos, according to the National Piano Manufacturers Association. (Just over a century later, in 2011, sales totaled about 41,000 pianos, 120,000 digital pianos, and 1.1 million keyboards, according to Music Trades magazine.)

==== E.R. Jacobson, president ====
Ernfrid (Ernest) Reinholdt Jacobson (25 December 1877 Gothenburg, Sweden – 19 June 1976 Chicago) – had begun at Straube in August 1898 as a bookkeeper and stenographer. After initially purchasing a small interest in the company, Jacobson became secretary, and continued to acquire stock from time to time.

In March 1911, Jacobson purchased the entire interest of the remaining partner and became president. He appointed his brothers as executives: Charles (Carl) Herman Jacobson Thorby (1875–1946), (Note: Charles (Carl) Herman Jacobson Thorby (11 July 1875 Göteborg, Sweden – 2 September 1946 Saugatuck, Michigan) was a full brother of Ernfrid (Ernest) Reinholdt Jacobson and James Frithiof Jacobson. His surname, Thorby, is a derivation of a longer, discarded Swedish surname (Thorbjornsen?) prior to immigrating with his mother and younger brother, Enifred in 1882. Charles was the oldest sibling. His father immigrated to the U.S. in 1880.) vice-president; and James Frithiof Jacobson (1885–1968), secretary, who all became owners and were actively involved with the further development of the business.

Presto-Times contributor Fred E. Cooper has written that Jacobson took the Straube Piano Company from ordinary piano manufacturer to one of the most successful contenders in the high-quality piano field. (Note: "Straube Piano Co.'s Production Sustained" Archived 2022-01-08 at the Wayback Machine, Issue 2207, November 17, 1928, pg. 11)

In 1913, construction began on the third addition to the original Straube factory erected in 1904 at 205 Manila Avenue. On January 30, 1930, the Hammond City Council enacted dozens of street name changes – including the change from Manila Avenue to Wildwood Street. The architect was J.T. Hutton (Joseph T. Hutton; 1861–1932) and the contractor was Mahlon Abraham Dickover (1856–1932)

In late 1914 or early 1915, the Straube Piano Company was incorporated in Indiana by the Jacobsons and Thorby with $150,000 (equivalent to $4,821,429 in 2025) capital stock. Around that time, the factory was producing about 12 finished pianos a day, for an annual production worth about three-quarters of a million dollars a year (equivalent to $24,107,143 in 2025) and employed about 150 men for an annual payroll of about $125,000 (equivalent to $4,017,857 in 2025).

Around 1916, the Straube Piano Company was manufacturing ten to twelve finished units a day.

=== 1920s ===
The company reached a peak monthly production volume in November 1922, surpassing its previous monthly high in March 1920. It has been estimated that, of the some 360,000 pianos produced in America in 1909, 56% were players.

In 1925, construction began on the fifth and largest addition to the original Straube factory. The architect was J.T. Hutton & Son, the son being William Sturgeon Hutton (1890–1975). The structure was four stories with a basement. The addition was devoted largely to the manufacture of grand and reproducing grand pianos.

In June 1925, Straube moved into the new plant. The new plant added 70,000 square feet of manufacturing space and provided a suite of new executive offices. The total floor-space, including the addition, was about a hundred and sixty thousand square feet. The new space was especially designed for a new unit that could produce 2,500 Straube grands a year to meet demand. William G. Betz – Straube's plant superintendent since 1917, piano design engineer, and inventor who was highly regarded by the industry – had spent several years perfecting the construction and design of the new Straube grands. Straube also hired William David McIlwrath (né McIlwraith; 1872–1931), a veteran piano factory superintendent and piano engineer with years of experience in the production of grands, to take charge a department in the new unit. (Note: "Straube Piano Co. Occupies New Building" Archived 2022-01-08 at the Wayback Machine, Issue 2027, May 30, 1925) McIlwrath had been the manufacturing superintendent of Jesse French & Sons Piano Co. of New Castle, Indiana, since February 16, 1920, and had been employed there since 1913. McIlwrath learned the profession in Canada, having been associated with many of the leading factories in the East. (Note: "New Superintendent Appointed" Archived 2017-11-24 at the Wayback Machine, Vol. 70, No. 8, February 21, 1920) (Note: "Appointed Superintendent of Straube Grand Factory" Archived 2022-01-08 at the Wayback Machine, Issue 2026, May 23, 1925, pg. 4)

In 1929, Straube began producing radios. (Note: "Straube Radio Merits" Archived 2022-01-08 at the Wayback Machine, Presto Times, Issue 2225, April 15, 1929)

Sales of pianos and player pianos, industry-wide, began to slip in the early 1920s, due partly to the rising popularity of radio as an alternative for home entertainment and due partly to the rising popularity of automobiles, which cost about the same as premium Straube pianos ($325; equivalent to $7,632 in 2025). And, like pianos, automobiles were commonly purchased on installment. In 1925, 80% of pianos sold by the retail trade were done so on installment plans. (Note: "Criticism of Installment Selling Is Because of Abuse of Plan", Vol. 82, No. 9, February 27, 1926, pg. 21) After the Wall Street Crash of 1929 and into the Great Depression, sales declined further and Straube began to struggle financially.

=== 1930s ===
In 1930, Straube was using the advertising firm of Lamport, Fox & Co., Irvin Sylvester Dolk (1891–1981), ad executive of South Bend, Indiana. (Note: "Trade Glances and Observations" Archived 2022-01-08 at the Wayback Machine, Presto-Times, Issue 2246, May 1930, pg. 9)

Struggling to survive, the Straube Piano Company sold its Hammond factory in 1931 to the J.L. Metz Furniture Co. for $125,000 (equivalent to $2,646,335 in 2025) and leased back a large portion of the building. In May 1934, the Straube Piano Company went into a friendly receivership. Roy Francis McPharlin (1893–1980) was appointed as receiver. On January 4, 1935, McPharlin distributed a "first and final" dividend of 8/10 of 1 cent of one dollar (i.e., 86¢ for $100) to the creditors. (Note: "Whew! 86/100 of 1 Per Cent!" Archived 2022-01-08 at the Wayback Machine Presto-Times, Issue 2275, March–April 1935) During the summer of 1935, the company reorganized. By then, it was still producing pianos, but occupied only a portion of the factory it once owned. The remainder of the plant was occupied by J.L. Metz Furniture Co. In 1935, the Straube Piano Company was being operated by the Fidelity Security Company, John Leonard Keilman (1867–1946), president. Fidelity Security was the finance arm of Straube Piano – dealing in piano paper and other securities.

When Straube went into receivership, all of its officers departed, including president Jacobson, president; C.H.J. Thorby, vice-president; and Alfred Theodore Schuldes (1892–1981), secretary-treasurer. Also, in 1935, William G. Betz (1871–1957), longtime superintendent with over 50 patents, left the company. In the interim, after the departure of Betz and before the appointment of Charles Henry Bartolomee as plant superintendent, Alvin Detloff Meyer (1879–1970), a Straube purchasing agent and longtime employee, took charge of manufacturing.

Around June 1936, Straube Piano Company moved its offices from the First Trust Building in Hammond to the Straube factory at 5049 Columbia Avenue in Hammond. And its board of directors elected Lemuel (Lem) Kline (1868–1945) as secretary-treasurer. (Note: "Who, What & Why" Archived 2022-01-08 at the Wayback Machine, Presto-Times, Issue 2279, June–July 1936, pg. 18)

On January 19, 1937, the Straube Piano Company was adjudicated bankrupt in United States District Court for the Northern District of Indiana, Hammond Division. In March 1937, the receiver for the Straube Piano Company sold all remaining assets for $4,655 (equivalent to $104,253 in 2025) to individuals who planned to continue the business. The dividend amount is not known. The assets consisted of the name and goodwill of the business, unfinished pianos – about twenty in process of construction – thirty piano cases unassembled, and various supplies of finished and unfinished materials and parts used in the construction of pianos, along with piano strings and wire and other parts for piano manufacturing. (Note: "The Straube Sale and Start Over Again" Archived 2017-11-24 at the Wayback Machine, Presto-Times, Issue 2282, June–July 1937, pg. 22)

==== Reorganization ====
A new company was formed in Indiana on March 27, 1937, as Straube Pianos Inc. located at 5049 Columbia Avenue and production of Straube pianos resumed in the leased portion of the Hammond factory that the former company once owned. The 1937 executives were:

- Walter Ernst Schrage (1912–1982), president, whose father, William Ernst Schrage (1884–1941), was president of the Bank of Whiting, Hammond, Indiana
- Max B. Pattiz (1890–1979), vice-president and general manager (former president of Lauter Piano Company, maker of the Lauter-Humana player piano, Newark, New Jersey)
- Harry E. Powers (1899–1954), secretary and treasurer; (Note: "Straube Piano Prospects Become Decidedly Encouraging" Archived 2022-01-08 at the Wayback Machine, Presto-Times, Issue 2283, November–December 1937, pg. 18) Powers was a lawyer from nearby Whiting, Indiana

=== 1940s ===
On May 1, 1940, Straube Pianos Inc. moved to Chicago Heights to occupy 48,000 sq. ft. of a warehouse owned by National Tea. The executives of the company were:

- Walter Ernst Schrage, Jr., president
- Charles Henry Bartholomee (1874–1960), who began as superintendent in 1935 and became Vice President of Straube Pianos Inc. in July 1940 (Note: "Building Pianos for 55 Years" Archived 2022-01-08 at the Wayback Machine, Vol. 100, No. 9, September 1941, pg. 17)
- Penfield Emory Mason (1875–1963), sales manager (sales manager many years with the Haddorff Co.)
- Charles Roy Arnold (born 1900), Atlanta manager (later, president) of Continental Music Inc., a division of C.G. Conn

In 1941, the executives were:

- Charles Henry Bartholomee, vice president Straube Pianos Inc.
- Herbert A. Koehlinger (1902–1955), vice president and New York manager (Eastern Manager of the Continental Music Co.); Koehlinger later was sales manager of the Fred Gretsch Manufacturing Company
- Paul M. Gazlay (1896–1966), president of Continental Music Inc.; Gazlay was president of C.G. Conn from 1949 to 1958

In October 1941, C.G. Conn acquired Straube Pianos Inc. For the previous two years, Continental Music Co. of Chicago – a subsidiary of Conn – had been the sales representative for Straube, with P. E. Mason as sales manager. Mason, in the mid-1920s, had been vice president of the Cable-Nelson Piano Company before it had merged with the Everett Piano Company in 1926. C.G. Conn extended the relationship with Continental and kept Bartholomee as the head of manufacturing. (Note: "Conn buys Straube Pianos Inc." Archived 2017-11-23 at the Wayback Machine Vol 100, No. 10, October 1941, pg. 14) Mason, who for many years had been the sales manager for the Haddorff Piano Co., Rockford, Illinois, joined Continental when C.G. Conn acquired Haddorff in November 1940. (Note: "Conn Interests Buy Haddorff" Archived 2022-01-08 at the Wayback Machine, Vol. 99, No. 11, November 1940, pg. 23)

Sometime before May 12, 1942, the U.S. War Production Board restricted piano production by C.G. Conn, Ltd., to 120 pianos a month. On May 12, 1942, C.G. Conn, Ltd., announced that it would consolidate its piano manufacturing by moving its Straube manufacturing from Chicago Heights to its Haddorff Piano manufacturing plant in Rockford, Illinois, at Railroad Avenue and 9th Street—a leased facility that Haddorff shared with the Rockford Chair and Furniture Company. Haddorff had sold its original Rockford plant on Harrison Avenue in 1940. In December 1940, a month after C.G. Conn's acquisition of the Haddorff Piano Company, Conn moved the Haddorff's manufacturing operations into the Railroad Avenue plant, which it had modernized.

On May 30, 1942 – a few weeks after C.G. Conn consolidated the manufacturing of Haddorff and Straube pianos at the Haddorff plant in Rockford – the War Production Board (WPB) ordered that manufacturing of pianos at the Rockford plant cease by July 31, 1942. Under a war contract between C.G. Conn, Ltd., and the U.S. War Department, the Rockford plant produced parts for gliders and trainer planes from 1942 to 1946.

The last published reference to the sale of a Straube piano was in July 1946, when the Haddorff Piano Co. of Rockford, Illinois, exhibited a complete line of Haddorff and Straube grands and spinets at the Palmer House in Chicago during the NAMM Convention. (Note: "Exhibits" Archived 2016-10-28 at the Wayback Machine, Vol. 105, No. 6, July 14–18, 1946, pg. 16) Production of Straube pianos ceased in 1949.

C.G. Conn retained ownership of Straube Pianos Inc. until 1969, when C.G. Conn was acquired by the Crowell-Collier MacMillan Company. The assets of Straube Piano Inc. included those acquired from the March 1937 receivers sale of the former Straube Piano Company. The Indiana corporate charters of (i) Straube Pianos Inc. (incorporated March 25, 1937), (ii) Straube Piano Company Inc. (incorporated November 14, 1941), and (iii) Struabe Piano and Music Company (incorporated October 24, 1922) expired January 1, 1970.

== Straube Piano & Music Company ==
The Straube Piano & Music Company was the retail division and subsidiary of the Straube Piano Company. It was launched around 1920. (Note: "Straube Company Buys Building" Archived 2022-01-08 at the Wayback Machine, Presto, Issue 1749, January 29, 1920, pg. 27; OCLC 29805477) Also, in 1920, the retail division purchased a two-story building on S Hohman Street in Hammond, Indiana for $75,000. The building housed four stores and six office suites yielding rental income of about $9,000 a year. The building was made of brick and terra cotta and had frontage of 100 feet on South Hohman Street. The directors of Straube Piano Company incorporated its retail division in 1922.

== Brands and models ==
=== Straube brands ===
- Straube
- Hammond – Hammond pianos and players were an outgrowth of the Hammond Piano Co., organized in Hammond, Indiana, in 1904, by James F. Broderick. The Straube Piano Company held a controlling interest in the company. The objective was to produce medium grade pianos, with comparable quality, at lower prices than the premium Straubes. (Note: "To Make the Hammond Piano", Vol. 39, No. 11, September 10, 1904, pg. 30) The Hammond Piano Co. launched its first two pianos in 1905, Style 21 and Style 23, both full uprights. Hammond pianos were made in the same factory as Straube and Gilmore pianos, but the Hammond Piano Co. business was kept separate. The Hammond Piano Co. was originally chartered in 1903 Illinois as the Chicago Electric Piano Co. by the Straube Piano Company. The incorporators were James T. Broderick, E. R. Jacobson and W. G. Martin, all of the Straube Piano Co. The purpose was to market a nickel-in-the-slot piano player known in the East as the Autoelectra. (Note: "Trade Conditions in Chicagio" Archived 2017-11-24 at the Wayback Machine, Vol. 36, No. 8, February 21, 1903, pg. 24, cols. 2-3) The name-change to Hammond Piano Co. was filed in Indiana in February 1905. (Note: "Trade Happenings in the West" Archived 2022-01-08 at the Wayback Machine, Vol. 40, No. 5, February 4, 1905, pps. 23 & 25)
- Gilmore – Gilmore pianos began production in 1904 as a private label for a retail customer in Philadelphia, the customer being Gustave Herzberg (1835–1924), father of Edward Herzberg (1870–1931), who ran the piano department at the Snellenburg Store. Edward left Straube as vice president in 1904 to join his father. The Gilmore line ran until about 1927. Earliest reference to a Gilmore Piano is 1900
- Woodward – manufactured after 1910

=== Straube models ===
Straube models and prices (f.o.b.) Hammond

Grands

- The Conservatory – (1926 – $950; equivalent to $17,277 in 2025)
- The Artist – (1926 – $795; equivalent to $14,458 in 2025)
- The Italian (1926)
- The Sonata Florentine (1926)

Reproducing

- Model C – (1926 – $2,575, equivalent to $46,829 in 2025, and up) – "An instrument which recreates with absolute fidelity the playing of the world's master pianists, a combination of the superb Straube Conservatory model grand with the famous Welte Mignon (Licensee) reproducing action. Its amazing range of expression imparts a realism which makes it impossible to distinguish the reproduction from the personal playing of the artist. A library of more than 4,000 rolls puts the world's greatest music at the disposal of the owner of a Straube Model C. R."

Players

- Style A (introduced in 1912) – Louis XV casing
- Style B (introduced in 1917 or prior)
- Style E
- Style 15 (introduced in 1917 or prior)
- Style T (introduced in 1922 or prior) – with Artronome Player Action
- The Arcadian – (1926 – $750; equivalent to $13,640 in 2025)
- The Imperial – (1926 – $675; equivalent to $12,276 in 2025)
- The Colonial – (1926 – $625; equivalent to $12,276 in 2025)
- The Puritan – (1926 – $595; equivalent to $10,821 in 2025)
- The Dominion – (1926 – $550; equivalent to $10,002 in 2025)
- Style 20 (1914)

Uprights

- (1926 – $395, $425, $525)
- Style J – Cabinet Grand (introduced in 1901 or prior)
- Style K – Cabinet Grand (introduced in 1901 or prior)
- Style L – Cabinet Grand (introduced in 1898)
- Style M – Cabinet Grand (introduced in 1898)
- Style B – Cabinet Grand (introduced in 1906) – "Elegant double veneered case, in fancy mahogany, Italian walnut, American burl walnut or oak; heavily cross banded with y8-inch stock; all carving hand work; all moldings cross veneered; hand carved trusses of natural woods; new cabinet grand scale with Capo 'dAstro bearing bar in bass section; patent improved double repeating action with brass capstan regulating screws in keys; improved double roll fall board; nickel-plated hammer rail and continuous hinges; ivory keys, noiseless pedals; nickel-plated tuning pins, fully bushed, copper wrapped bass strings. The inside of this case is lined throughout with bird's-eye maple, finished in keeping with the balance of the instrument. Dimensions: 7 1-3 octaves; height, 4 feet 8 inches; with, 5 feet 3 inches; depth, 2 feet 4 inches.
- Style C (introduced in 1905 or prior)
- Style I (introduced in 1905 or prior)
- Style D (1914)
- Style O (introduced 1912) – double veneered case, with full extension music desk, new grand scale with capo D'Astro bearing bar on bass section, nickel plated tuning pins, brass strings wrapped with copper, patent improved double repeating action with brass capstan regulating screws in keys, bushed tuning pins, nickel plated hammer rail, continuous hinges, improved double roll fall board, ivory keys and patent noiseless pedals. It is 4 feet 8 inches in height
- Style S – similar to the Style O
- Style F (introduced on or before 1925)
- Style G (introduced on or before 1925)
- Style H (introduced on or before 1925)
1901 Straube Cabinet Grand (SN 9788)

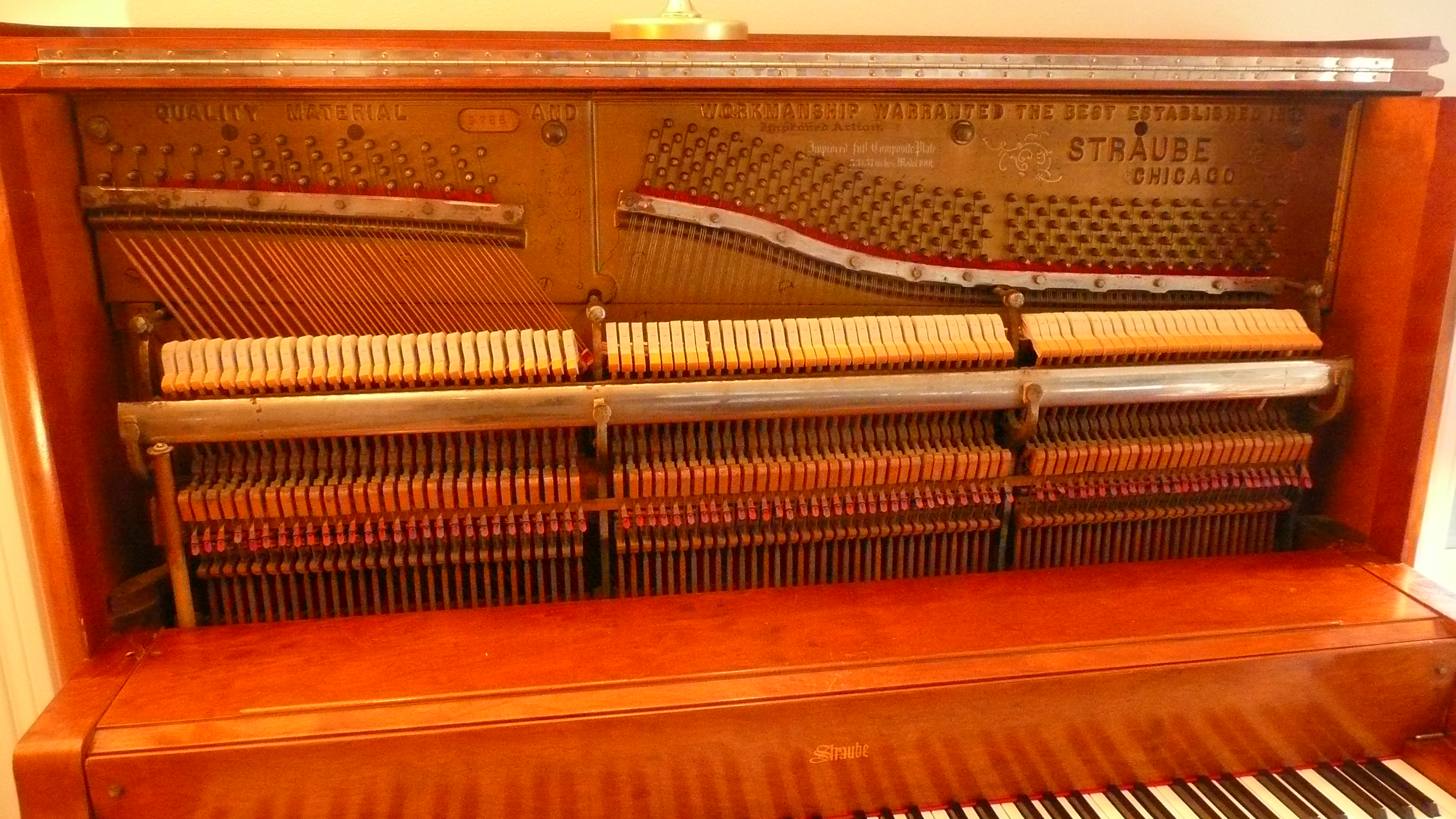
Pin block, hammer rail

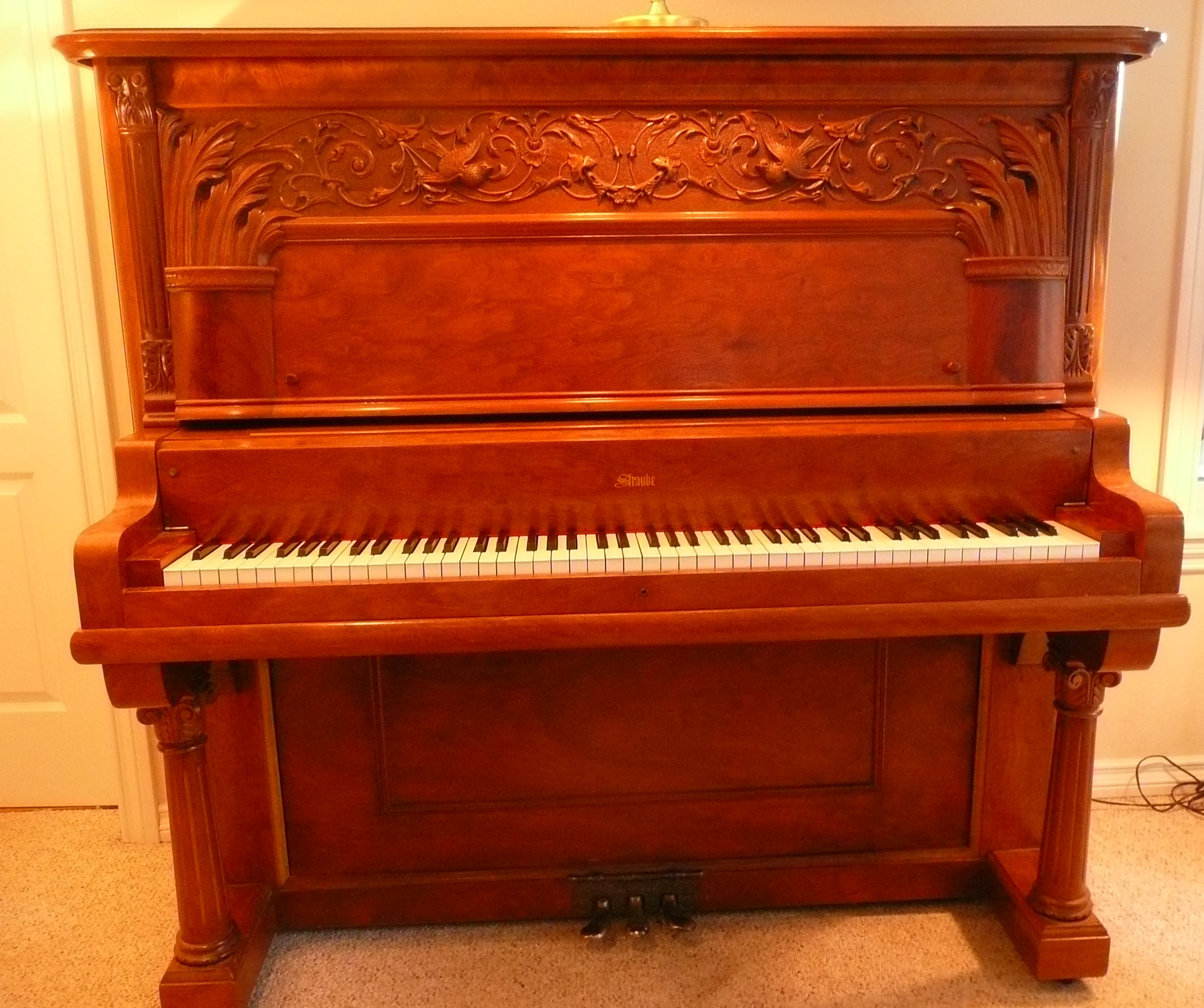
Full console

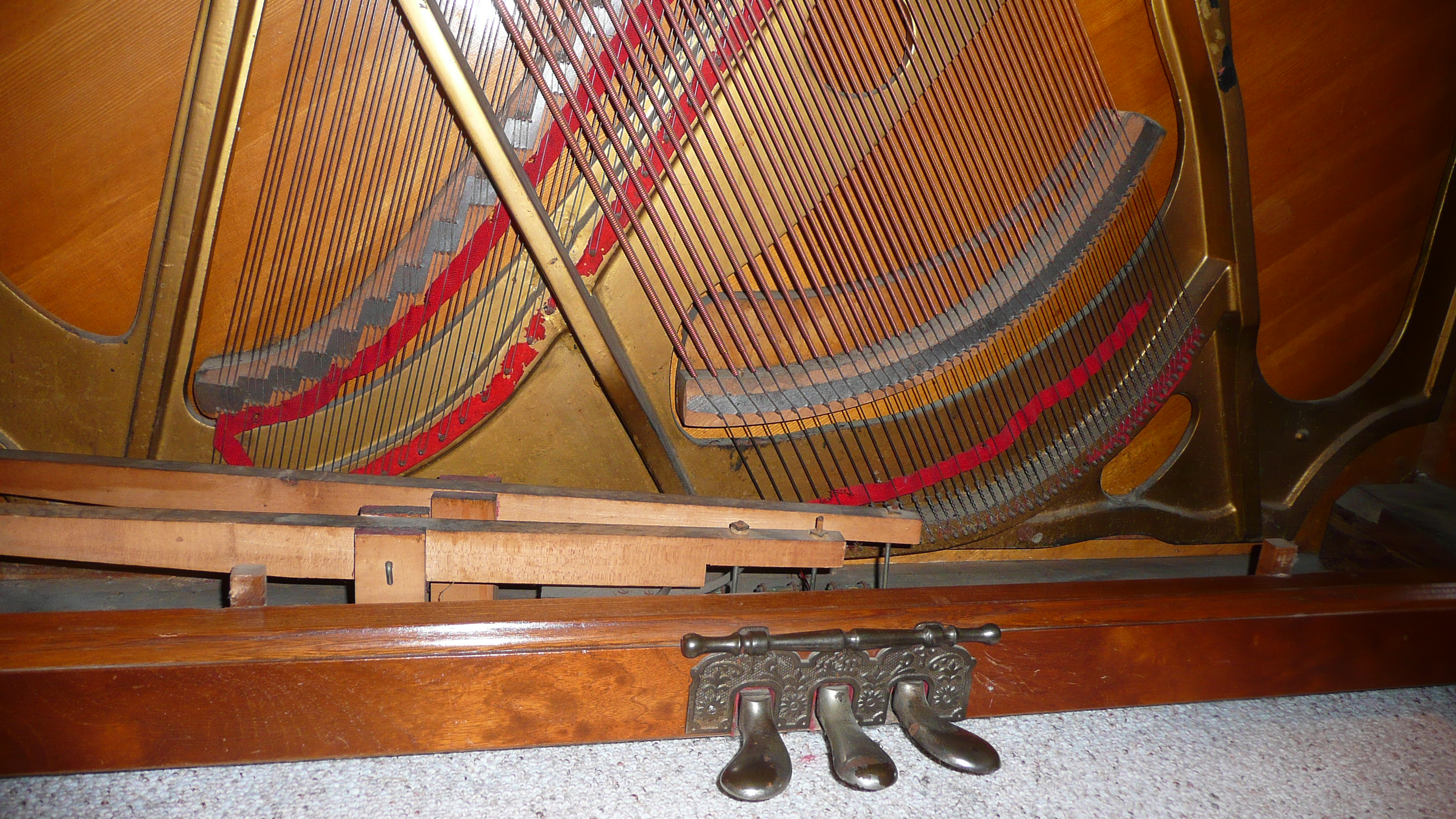
Pedals, treble bridge, bass bridge, metal frame, hitch pins, soundboard

=== Hammond models ===
Players

- Hammond Style 10 (1914), made of mahogany & oak
- The Artronome player action, introduced on Straube player pianos in May 1921, (Note: "The Secret of Dependability in Straube-Made Player-Pianos" Archived 2022-01-08 at the Wayback Machine (illustrated advertisement), Vol. 75, No. 7, August 12, 1922, pg. 10) included patented pendulum valves, one for each note, a tenpoint customized motor, and an automatic ball-bearing roll adjuster for the tracking. (Note: "Straube Piano Co." Archived 2022-01-08 at the Wayback Machine, Vol. 72, No. 20, May 14, 1921, pg. 101)

The valve, according to the company, became the heart of the Artronome action. According to Straube literature, it was frictionless, non-corrosive, and eliminated 90 percent of all player problems caused by friction and corrosion in the mechanism. By 1922, over one million Straube pendulum valves had been installed in player pianos of various makes.
The valves were three-tier and horizontal, but not the more common type found in horizontal valve actions, which were usually the wire i-pin variety. Each valve pivoted between two ears that extended from each metal plate.
Each valve was a wood disc with leather facing on both sides. One face had a center hole leading to a pocket of a larger diameter in the wood. The valve was supported only by a lever between the valve plate pivot and the pouch lifter disc, with a right angle dowel extension that "plugged in" the center hole of the valve button. The pivotal lever is easily removable because it was not cemented to the valve, rendering a loose valve button in the valve well behind the valve plate that was screwed onto the valve chest with white sealing compound.

- The Straube Style L was a short upright – only 3 ft 7 inches tall, introduced in 1926 – that incorporated Straube's patented Duplex Overstringing. Straube claimed that the Duplex Overstringing enabled the piano to produce the sound of a full upright.
- The Melo-Harp was a patented pneumatic-controlled attachment for Straube pianos.
- The Straube Grands offered in 1927 included lengths four-foot-four, five-foot-two, six-foot, and six-foot-two in various styles.
- Straube Reproducing Grands were automated player pianos that used a Welte-Mignon action manufactured under license by the Auto Pneumatic Action Co. of Manhattan, New York.

In 1924, Straube introduced individual names for its players rather than alpha letters in an effort to stimulate retail sales. A year earlier, Straube introduced a uniform national pricing policy. In 1923, Straube also launched a national advertising campaign.

Explanation of the term Studio Grand: A tall upright piano – 50 inches or taller, one that a person of average height can't see over when seated at the bench – is sometimes referred to as an "upright grand". Straube branded it as a "Cabinet Grand". Use of the word "grand" with uprights should not be confused with concert grands. Upright grands can be of high quality and – short of concert grands – are often the choice of serious pianists, recording studios, and performance venues. A mid-high upright – one that one can barely see over – is often used in dance studios, where an accompanist can see the dancers. A short upright, one that rises less than a foot above the keyboard, is referred to as a spinet. Serious pianists typically regard spinets as inadequate because the soundboard is too short to produce a full sound with full overtones.

== Sample Straube serial numbers ==
Straube serial numbers run from 1895 to 1949

SN: 6692 (1896–1897) – upright
SN: 7370 (1898) – upright
SN: 7371 (1898) – upright (engraved wood casing)
SN: 7381 (1898) – upright (exported to Liverpool, England)
SN: 8311 (1898–1899) – Gabriel W, grand
SN: 9058 (1900) – upright
SN: 9547 (1901) – upright
SN: 9577 (1901) – upright
SN: 9788 (1901) – upright
SN: 10028 (1901) – upright
SN: 10606 (1902) – upright
SN: 11271 (1903) – upright
SN: 11428 (1904) – upright
SN: 11552 (1905) – Cabinet Grand (upright) ("Est 1878")
SN: 13962 (1907) – upright
SN: 13992 (1907) – baby grand
SN: 18629 (1912)
SN: 19051 (1912) – upright ("double repeating action")
SN: 19373 (1912) – upright
SN: 19382 (1912) - Upright
SN: 23588 (1915)
SN: 26145 (1916) – upright
SN: 23588 (or 45756) (1919) – Melo-Harp, full upright
SN: 25077 (1916) – Cabinet Grand (upright)
SN: 28336 (1917) – player
SN: 29582 (1918) – Upright Grand
SN: 33346 (1919) – upright
SN: 34619 (1920) – upright
SN: 37784 (1921) - player - w/French Repeating Action. Manufactured for the Wm.H.Elsinger stores in St. Paul Minnesota.
SN: 38173 (1921) – player
SN: 39876 (1922) – upright
SN: 41441 (1923) – upright
SN: 41953 (1923) – baby grand
SN: 44412 (1923) – player
SN: 45813 (1924) – player
SN: 46026 (1924) – player
SN: 47555 (1925) – upright
SN: 47715 (1925) – player

Patented vertical Grand French Repeating Action Piano"
"new improved"
"scale with patent double repeating"

SN: 49041 (1925) – upright
SN: 49339 (1925) – upright
SN: 50066 (1925) – baby grand
SN: 50224 (1925) – upright
SN: 50839 (1925) – full upright
SN: 53477 (1926) – player, French Repeating Action
SN: 54624 (1927) – player
SN: 54873 (1927) – upright
SN: 55030 (1927) – baby grand
SN: 55857 (1927) – upright (National Piano Manufactures Assc. Certicificate #858800)
SN: 56002 (1928) – grand
SN: 57098 (1928) – Sonata, baby grand video on YouTube
SN: 57447 (1928) – player, style H, ID 58558
SN: 59314 (1938) – upright
SN: 59384 (1929) – Vertical Grand French Repeating Action
SN: 59577 (1930) – Vertical Grand French Repeating Action ("Est 1878") ("CW Lindsay, Montreal, Quebec, Canada)
SN: 60001 (1931) – upright
SN: 61593 (1938)
SN: 61953 (1938) – spinet, 38' x 59' x 23
SN: 62937 (1939) – spinet
SN: 63593 (1941) – upright
SN: 63703 (1941) – upright
SN: 64165 (1941) – upright
SN: 64232 (1941) – spinet
SN: 64396 (1941) – spinet
SN: 65065 (1949) – upright
SN: 66090 (1949) – Sonata, baby grand

National Music Museum No. 14434. Upright piano with player mechanism (Hammond Melo-Harp) by the Straube Co., Hammond, Indiana, manufactured 1916, serial no. 26494. AAA-c5 (7+ octaves). Three pedals: half blow, "Melo-Harp" (tabs with staples for a jarring, "honky-tonk" tone), dampers. Purchased by Perry Fulton Pinkerton (1873–1952) for his wife, Isadora Edna (née Rouff; 1876–1923), in 1918. Delivered by train and wagon to the family farmhouse in Quimby, Iowa, where it remained until coming to the NMM, this player piano filled family events with music and provided accompaniment for dancing. Gift of Edward and James Pinkerton, grandsons, in memory of their parents, Ross Cavanaugh Pinkerton (1913–2009) and Arlene Jane (née Bugh; 1919–2009) late of Quimby, Iowa.

Woodward

SN: 16170 (1910) – upright
SN: 16298 (1910) – upright
SN: 21937 (1914) – Cabinet Grand (upright)
SN: 22883 (1915) – Cabinet Grand (upright)
SN: 26096 (1916) – upright
SN: 35355 (1920) – player
SN: 36715 (1921) – upright
SN: 41441 (1923) – player
SN: 57908 (1929) – upright

Hammond

SN: 8743 (1900) – upright
SN: 15972 (1909) – Cabinet Grand (upright)
SN: 17868 (1911) – upright
SN: 20401 (1913) – Cabinet Grand (upright)
SN: 22759 (1915) – upright player
SN: 23414 (1915) – upright
SN: 23707 (1915) – Cabinet Grand (upright)
SN: 24488 (1915) – Cabinet Grand (upright) (price in gold lettering $650)
SN: 25340 (1916) – Cabinet Grand (upright)
SN: 27297 (1917) – full upright
SN: 28895 (1917) – Cabinet Grand (upright)
SN: 29761 (1918) – Cabinet Grand (upright)
SN: 41297 (1923) – upright
SN: 43381 (1923) – upright player Melo-Harp with Artronome player action
SN: 43908 (1923) – upright (vertical grand French repeating action)
SN: 44689 (1924) – upright player
SN: 49853 (1925) – upright player
SN: 58809 (1946) – upright (vertical grand French repeating action, about 52" high)

Playtona mfg by Straube for Grinnell Brothers

SN: 49381 (1953) – 1953

Straube Piano Company & Straube Pianos Inc. serial numbers

1895: 6500
1900: 8700
1901: 9400
1902: 10300
1903: 10900
1904: 11400
1905: 11900
1906: 12600
1907: 13500
1908: 14300
1909: 15100
1910: 16000
1911: 17200
1912: 18400
1913: 19600
1914: 21000
1915: 22500
1916: 24500
1917: 27000
1918: 29500
1919: 31700
1920: 34000
1921: 36900
1922: 38400
1923: 41200
1924: 44600
1925: 47000
1926: 51000
1927: 54000
1928: 56000
1929: 57800
1930: 59400
1931: 59995
(no data for 1932–35)
1936: 60000
1937: 60500
1938: 61000
1939: 62000
1940: 62500
1941: 63500
1942: 64500
1949: 65021

Notes: In 1954, the Hammond Organ Co. acquired the Everett and Cable Nelson names and also started building Hammond pianos. These Hammond Pianos are of no relation to those once produced by Straube. Hammond pianos were discontinued around 1965.

=== Selected owners, executives, and managers ===
James Francis Broderick

James (Jim) Francis Broderick (19 August 1854 Philadelphia – 17 November 1920 Chicago) became president on January 1, 1898, and served in that role until March 1911. Before joining Straube Piano, Broderick had been a traveling salesman for Steger & Company and the B. Shoninger Co.

Ernfrid Reinholdt Jacobson

E.R. Jacobson was the son of Charles Frithiof Jacobson (1852–1906), and Helena (née Nicholson; 1845–1910). Ernfrid Jacobson, with his parents, immigrated to the United States in 1882 and settled in Chicago. Jacobson received his public school education in Chicago. He began his career as an office boy, then a bookkeeper and general office utility man for various concerns until August 1898.

In addition to being president part owner with his brothers of Straube Piano Company and Straube Piano & Music Co., which operated several music stores; E.R. Jacobson also was president of the Fidelity Security Co., dealers in piano paper and other securities, and treasurer of the Hammond Machine and Forge Works.

Politically, E.R. Jacobson was a Republican. He was a member of the Bethlehem Swedish Lutheran Church of Englewood, Illinois, where he had been a trustee since 1898, and was also the treasurer of the church. He resided at 5754 Fifth avenue.

William Straube

William Straube, before 1894, had been president of the Schaeffer Piano Company, which in 1896, had a sales room on the second floor of 236 Wabash Avenue, Chicago.

After Straube sold his interest in the Straube Piano Company in 1901, he focused on his real estate development business in Downers Grove, Illinois. In 1902, Straube became a director of the Cerro Mojarra Plantation Company, a ranching and agricultural firm operating in Oaxaca, Mexico.

The Schaeffer Piano Company, founded by William Schaeffer (1832–1888) in Württemberg, Germany, around 1872, was established in New York in 1877. Schaeffer had factories at 472 West 43rd Street, and 456 West 37th Street, Manhattan, New York. Then, in 1889, after Schaeffer's death, the company was established in Illinois and incorporated on December 31, 1891, in Illinois, by Charles M. Herman, Isaac Newton Rice (1847–1929), and Samuel Ringgold Huyett (1946–1911).

In 1892, the Schaeffer's piano factory, located in Oregon, Illinois, had 90 employees and was producing 20 pianos a week.

In the fall of 1894, Scheaffer Piano Co. (William Straube, president), moved its manufacturing operations from Oregon, Illinois, to River View – on the Wisconsin Railway, two miles from the Chicago city limit. The new facility had twice the floor space.

Under financial duress in 1896, the assets of Schaeffer Piano were assigned its assets to the creditor, Floyd E. Jennison (1857–1920), in the Cook County Court. (Note: "Hallet & Davis Interest Assign" Archived 2022-01-08 at the Wayback Machine, Vol. 23, No. 1, July 25, 1896, pg. 13) The goodwill and patents were sold to Thomas Edwin Dougherty (Note: "Jude Rice Dies at Dallas, a Victim of Pneumonia" Archived 2022-01-08 at the Wayback Machine, Presto, Issue 1751, February 12, 1920, pg. 12) who, in 1895, re-established and re-incorporated the company as Schaeffer Piano Manufacturing Company.

In 1902, while Thomas Edwin Dougherty (1856–1943) was president, the Schaeffer Piano Company manufacturing plant in River View had a fire. The company subsequently erected a new plant in Kankakee, Illinois. (Note: "Trade Happenings in the Western Metropolis" Archived 2017-09-26 at the Wayback Machine, Vol. 36, No. 9, February 28, 1903, pg. 25)

In 1891, William Straube went into partnership with Alfred Roland Heckman (1859–1914), a brother of his wife, Jessica Fremont Heckman (1857–1944), both of 8 Heckman siblings. Their firm, Heckman & Straube, sold land lots in Downers Grove beginning 1891.

Martin Straube

The 1910 Census shows Martin living in Oregon, Illinois, perhaps working for the Schiller Piano Company sometime before 1910. In 1940, he was living in Los Angeles, still working in the piano business.

James Frithiof Jacobson

James (Jimmy) Frithiof Jacobson (5 February 1885 Chicago – December 1968 Hammond, Indiana) attended public schools in Chicago. After leaving school worked in a warehouse for two years, then spent eight years with the Crerar-Adams Company, a railway supply firm. Following that, he and his brother, Ernfrid Reinholdt Jacobson, became associated in a music store at Indiana Harbor. (Note: "A Trio of Able Young Men" Archived 2022-01-08 at the Wayback Machine, Vol. 53, No. 11, September 16, 1911, pg. 17)

Others

Clinton Wilson Howe (born 1875), bookkeeper at Straube Piano from 1895 to 1897

=== Directors and executives ===
- January 4, 1901: Straube Piano Company

James F. Broderick, president
Edward Herzberg, vice-president,
E.R. Jacobson, secretary (Note: "Straube Officers" Archived 2017-11-24 at the Wayback Machine, Vol. 32, No. 2, January 12, 1901, pg. 9)

- 1902: Straube Piano Company

24 Adams Street, Chicago

E.R. Jacobson, Secretary & Director
William Straube, Manager & Director
James F. Broderick, Secretary, Treasurer, Director
Edward Herzberg (born 1859), Vice-President & Director; he left Straube in 1904 to join his brother Harry and father Gustave in Philadelphia to run the piano department of the Snellenburg Store. (Note: "The 'Commission' Question in Philadelphia" Archived 2017-11-23 at the Wayback Machine, Vol. 38, No. 16, April 16, 1904, pg. 13)

- 1905: Straube Piano Company

24-26 Adams Street, Chicago (Stevens Building)

James F. Broderick, President, Treasurer, Manager and Director
Mary D. Broderick (1862–1932), Vice-President and Director (wife of James F. Broderick)
Edward Herzberg (43), Vice-President and Director
Ernfrid Reinholdt Jacobson, 43, Secretary and Director
William Straube, President, Manager and Director

- April 1905

James F. Broderick, president
William P. Parker (1843–1907), vice president (Note: "Death of Capt. Parker" Archived 2022-01-08 at the Wayback Machine, Vol. 44, No. 20, May 18, 1907, pg. 25)
Ernfrid Reinholdt Jacobson, secretary
James Frithiof Jacobson (born 1885), secretary

=== Superintendents and foremen ===
- 1906–19??: Gunnar G. Lindstrom (1870–1949), became superintendent in 1906. He became the superintendent at the Haddorff Piano Company and in 1923, moved into sales at Haddorff
- 1917–1935: William G. Betz (1871–1957), superintendent from 1917 to 1935, (over 50 patents), left the company in 1935. After leaving Straube, Betz patented several piano action mechanisms and assigned them to Pratt Read and Company Inc., maker of piano mechanisms.
- 1935–1942: Charles Henry Bartholomee (1874–1960) began as superintendent and was superintendent in July 1940; in 1940, Bartholomee became Vice President of Straube Pianos Inc. (Note: "Charles H. Bartholomee Made Vice President of Straube Pianos Inc.", Presto Music Times, Issue 2295, September 1940, pg. 20) Before joining Straube, he had been superintendent of the Smith Barnes Piano Factory for several years and superintendent of the P.A. Starck Piano Co., Chicago, also for several years.
- 1925–1930: William David McIlwrath (1872–1931), foreman, under Bartholomee's direction, of the manufacturer of Straube Grands
- 1942–1949: Carl Leopold Haddorff (1895–1952), son of Charles A. Haddorff (1864–1928), co-founder of the Haddorff Piano Company
- Roy Hilmer Olsen (1888–1965), in 1920, was a foreman for Straube; in 1930 he was a clerk for a candy manufacturer in Chicago; and in 1942 he was working for Carnegie-Illinois Steel Company. His father, John Olsen, a Norwegian immigrant, was a piano maker.

=== Wholesale and retail sales ===
- Charles W. Smith (1861–1932), appointed manager in 1920 of Straube's retail division
- Alfred Theodore Schuldes (1892–1981) (Note: "Meet the Straube Forces" Archived 2022-01-08 at the Wayback Machine, Presto, Issue 1922, May 26, 1923, pg. 24) (Note: "Conference of Straube Forces" Archived 2022-01-08 at the Wayback Machine, Presto-Times, Issue 2165, January 28, 1928, pg. 12)
- 1923–1926: James Randolph Adams Archived 2014-08-26 at the Wayback Machine (1898–1956), 1960 posthumous inductee into the American Advertising Federation Hall of Fame Adams credited his success to his first job, which was with Straube as advertising and sales promotion manager.
- William S. Robertson (1860–1924), joined Straube around 1913 and was its Eastern representative until he suffered a stroke in October 1923 (Note: "Death of W.S. Robertson" Archived 2022-01-08 at the Wayback Machine, Vol. 80, No. 2, January 10, 1925, pg. 28)
- W.J. Robertson (born approx 1898), nephew of William S. Robertson, joined Straube at the end of 1920
- James Newton England (1882–1956), Atlanta sales representative
- Roy Solomon Dunn (1877–1932), joined Straube at the end of 1920; on January 1, 1927, Dunn became Western sales manager of Brinkerhoff Piano Co. of Chicago; Dunn became the Western sales manager for Splitdorf Radio Corp. in January 1928, (Note: "Dunn Western Sales Manager of Splitdorf" Archived 2022-01-08 at the Wayback Machine, Vol. 86, No. 86, February 4, 1928, pg. 16) the year that Thomas A. Edison, Inc., acquired the firm
- James Alfred Terry (born 1889) – After working with Straube, Terry co-founded the James A. Terry Piano Co. in 1913 in Duluth, Minnesota, operating as a piano retailer under the name of Terry-Gulliuson Piano Co.
- Leroy Jovst Viersin, Sr. (1878–1959)
- J. Roy Huckins, traveling salesman – central and northwestern wholesale representative from 1922 to 1926 (Note: 1928 "Straube Piano Co. Holds Its Annual Sales Meeting" Archived 2021-04-22 at the Wayback Machine, Vol. 86, No. 4, January 28, 1928, pg. 7)
- Henry Anthony Erikson (1884–1949) – salesman, Straube Music Store
- Armon C. Harper (born 1894) – salesman, Straube Piano Company
- Oscar Andrew Lindholm (1884–1932) – piano salesman, Staube Music Store
- George Burl Simpson (1887–1954), based out of Chillicothe, Missouri, started May 1921 as a traveling salesman for Straube, covering Missouri and Eastern Kansas
- Hugh Alexander Stewart (1890–1963), began as a sales, advertising, and promotion manager in September 1927 (Note: "H.A. Stewart Joins the Straube Piano Co." Archived 2017-11-23 at the Wayback Machine, Vol. 85, No. 10, September 3, 1927, pg. 16) In 1936, Stewart was sales manager for Rudolph Wurlitzer Company, and in 1938 he ascended to vice president. He retired from Wurlitzer in 1958.
- David Lord Sterling (1882–1949), formerly a traveling salesman for Poole Piano Co. of Boston
- R.A. Rasmusson
- William H. Rasmusson (born 1883)
- Charles A. Clinton (1902–1986), sales manager at Straube from about 1939 to 1942
- Lemuel (Lem) Kline (1868–1945), general sales manager beginning around 1936
- Robert Edward Lauer (born 1891) joined Straube's traveling sales force in 1927 to cover Ohio and West Virginia.

"In the retail piano business today, conditions have changed materially from what they were a few years ago. Instead of simply considering old names and traditions as an asset, we are now obliged to treat with modern forms of merchandising, both buying and selling. We have to think in terms of dollars and cents and it is from this angle that the Straube line is particularly interesting. Any merchant who adopts the Straube system of retail piano business operation is bound to make money with it." (Note: "Robert E. Lauer Joins Straube Road Forces" Archived 2017-11-25 at the Wayback Machine, Presto-Times, Issue 2152, October 29, 1927, pg. 4)

- Joseph Edward Albineau (1886–1961) became general representative for Straube in 1927, covering Wisconsin, Minnesota, North Dakota, and South Dakota. (Note: "New Representative For The Straube Piano Co.", Presto-Times, Issue, 2150, October 15, 1927, pg. 8)
- W.E. Gillespie, was a traveling representative in Missouri and Illinois for Straube from before 1915 to 1927, when he moved on to become special representative for W.W. Kimball Co. In 1931, based in Seattle, Gillespie was representative for Starr Piano. In 1934, he was a representative for Haddorff.
- C.E. West
- Simien Myers Wessel (1873–1947) had been the treasurer for R.K. Maynard Co. until about 1912, when the company went bankrupt. He then founded a piano company that produced pianos bearing his name, "S.M. Wessel". By 1915, Wessel was a wholesale rep for Straube. (Note: "Straube Co. Sales Force Meet" Archived 2017-11-23 at the Wayback Machine, Vol. 60, No. 3, January 16, 1915, pg. 45)

=== Others ===
- Alvin Detloff Meyer (1879–1970), a Straube purchasing agent and longtime employee who served as an interim superintendent in 1935 after its first reorganization and subsequent departure of William G. Betz, was, in 1928, instrumental in developing a more sustainable solution for fastening legs to the cases of Straube Grands. Blackhawk Foundry & Machine Co. of Davenport, Iowa, designed more sturdy plates in response to a design request letter that Meyer had sent to several manufacturers. (Note: "New Straube Piano Improvement Announced" Archived 2022-01-08 at the Wayback Machine, Issue 2202, October 13, 1928, pg. 17) Straube Piano announced the innovation to its competitors and by the end of 1928, Blackhawk was making the plates for 13 of the largest piano manufacturers in the country.

== Addresses ==
=== Retail sales ===
1898–19??: 24-26 East Adams Street, Chicago
1911: 59 Adams Street, Chicago
1915: 209 South State Street, Chicago
190?–1922 (and longer?): 631 Hohman Street, Hammond
5247 Hohman Avenue, Hammond

=== Factory: 252 Wildwood Road ===
- 205 Manila Avenue at Havanna Street, Hammond, Indiana (Manila Avenue was renamed Wildwood Road in 1930)
- Frontage is at 252 Wildwood Rd., service entrance on Kenwood St. (parallel to Wildwood), property is bounded on the north by Wildwood, east by Monon Trail, the south by Kenwood. The property is an L-shape, turn counterclockwise 90 degrees – the most northern border is bounded by Conkey Street. On Kenwood, across the street, is the Oak Hill Cemetery.
- Factory: Wildwood
- 1913: Showroom at 59 East Adams Street, Chicago
- 1919: Straube purchased a 2-story brick and terracotta building on South Hohman Street, where the firm had been located for years.

== Straube photo archives ==
- "Cutting up" – President Rick Ricketson, Al Young (Peerless Printing), Duke Melody (pianist); (1955); OCLC 55122989

== Videos ==
- "Second Hand Rose", Straube Player on YouTube
- "The Entertainer", Straube Player on YouTube
- "Charleston", Straube Player on YouTube
- Hammond Melo-Harp on YouTube
- "My Blue Heaven", Hammond Melo-Harp on YouTube
- "Never On Sunday", Straube Player on YouTube

== Other Straube names in music not related to Straube Piano ==
J. Straube & Co., Berlin

Straube Piano Company was not related to J. Straube & Co., in Berlin, an organ maker founded in 1869 that endured until 1972. In 1903, its founding owners were Johannes Straube (1843–1906) & Karl Straube (1873–1950), father and son. Johannes, an organist, was the superintendent. Johannes was also the son of J.C.F. Straube, a violin maker. In 1923, Otto Pappe (1882–1972) became the owner. Otto's son, Reinhard Pappe (1908–1972), succeeded him as owner until his death in 1972, when the firm was dissolved. William Straube (de), the German painter, was also a son of Johannes. None of the Straubes from this family were directly related to William Straube of the Straube Piano Co.

William J. Straub, organ builder

William J. Straub (1859–1946), who is listed in the 1901, 1902, and 1904 Syracuse City Directories, was an organ builder. This Straub is unrelated.

Alois Straub, organ builder

Alois Straub (1826 Baden, Germany – 1883) was a manufacturer of reed organs. He learned cabinet making and worked with the manufacturing of musical instruments in Germany before emigrating to the United States in 1849. Straub settled in Akron, Ohio, and, from about 1852 to 1856, made organs for H.B. Horton (Henry Bishop Horton; 1819–1885). Straub then worked as a traveling salesman for Horton & Rose (Ira Rose; 1820–1891) from 1857 to 1861. Straub opened Akron's first music store 1861 at 148 (later 163) S. Howard Street. Straub was a manufacturer of reed organs under his own name from about 1870 to 1875.

== Affiliations ==
- National Piano Travelers Association, E.R. Jacobson, et al.
- National Piano Manufacturers Association, Straube Piano Co.

E.R. Jacobson, past president

- Hammond Manufacturers Association

E.R. Jacobson, elected president 1925

- Chicago Piano & Organ Association

== Selected patents ==
In the mid 1920s, Straube Piano had some patents that influenced the industry. In 1926, Straube introduced its patented Duplex Overstringing system (Note: "New Straube Small Upright Piano Offers Radical Scale Development" Archived 2017-11-22 at the Wayback Machine, Vol. 83, No. 13, September 25, 1926, pg. 19) – US Patent No. 1769284 – claiming that it enabled smaller Straube uprights to produce the sound of full uprights and Straube's smallest grand, the Sonata Grand, to produce the sound of a full concert grand. The Straube Artronome player piano had many patented innovations, including one that improved pumping power from the foot pedals.

- Roy Hilmer Olsen:

Patents
1916: US 1205561 A – "Tone Modulating Device" (Note: Gazette, Vol. 232, November 1916, pps. 770-771 Roy Hilmer Olsen, assignor to Straube Piano Company "Tone Modulating Device for Pianos" US 1205561 A, filed June 1, 1915, serial no. 31,402, granted November 21, 1916) (Note: "A Tone Modulating Device" Archived 2022-01-08 at the Wayback Machine, Vol. 63, No. 26, December 23, 1916, pg. 25)

Assignments to Straube
1916: US 1205561 A – assigned to Straube Piano Company

- William G. Betz during his tenure with Steger & Sons Piano Manufacturing Company:

Patents
1907: US 867002 A – "Piano" (strengthening how an agraffe is mounted) (Note: Gazette, Vol. 130, September 3 to October 29, 1907, pg. 1177 William G. Betz "Piano" (strengthening how an agraffe is mounted) US 867002 A, filed January 17, 1907, serial no. 352,703, granted September 4, 1907)
1911: US 1024174 A – "Tracking Device for Pneumatic Action" (Note: Gazette, Vol. 177, pg. 909 William G. Betz, assignor to Steger & Sons Piano Manufacturing Company "Tracking Device for Pneumatic Action" US 1024174 A, filed June 12, 1911, serial no. 632,586, granted April 23, 1912)
1911: US 1037584 A – "Hammer-Rail Construction for Pneumatic Pianos" (Note: Gazette, Vol. 182, September 1912, pg. 137 William G. Betz, assignor to Steger & Sons Piano Manufacturing Company "Hammer-Rail Construction for Pneumatic Pianos" US 1037584 A Archived 2025-08-14 at the Wayback Machine, filed June 12, 1911, serial no. 632,585, granted September 3, 1912)
1912: US 1023613 A – "Pneumatic Action" (Note: Gazette, Vol. 177, April 1912, pg. 694–695 William G. Betz, assignor to Steger & Sons Piano Manufacturing Company "Pneumatic Action" US 1023613 A, filed April 11, 1910, serial no. 554,850, granted April 16, 1912)
1912: US 1021502 A – "Pneumatic Action" (Note: Gazette, Vol. 176, March 1912, pg. 960 William G. Betz, assignor to Steger & Sons Piano Manufacturing Company "Pneumatic Action" US 1021502 A Archived 2025-08-14 at the Wayback Machine, filed January 7, 1911, serial no. 601,450, granted March 26, 1912)
1912: US 1048486 A – "Pneumatic Action" (Note: Gazette, Vol. 185, December 31 1912, pps. 1064–1065 William G. Betz, assignor to Steger & Sons Piano Manufacturing Company "Pneumatic Action" US 1048486 A, filed March 13, 1911, serial no. 614,236, granted December 31, 1912)
1914: US 1197596 A – "Pneumatic Action for Pianos" (Note: Gazette, Vol. 230, September 1916, pg. 345 William G. Betz "Pneumatic Action for Pianos" US 1197596 A Archived 2025-08-14 at the Wayback Machine, filed May 8, 1914, serial no. 837,130, granted September 12, 1916)
1916: US 1174807 A – "Pneumatic Action" (Note: Gazette, Vol. 224, March 1916, pps. 284–285 William G. Betz "Pneumatic Action" US 1174807 A Archived 2025-08-14 at the Wayback Machine, filed May 20, 1914, serial no. 839,724, granted March 7, 1916)

Assignments to Steger & Sons
1911: US 1037584 A – assigned to Seger & Sons
1911: US 1024174 A – assigned to Seger & Sons
1912: US 1023613 A – assigned to Seger & Sons
1912: US 1021502 A – assigned to Seger & Sons
1912: US 1048486 A – assigned to Seger & Sons

- William G. Betz during his tenure with Straube Piano:

Patents
1914: US 1335476 A – "Pneumatic Action for Pianos" (Note: Gazette, Vol. 272, March 1920, pg. 841 William G. Betz "Pneumatic Action for Pianos" US 1335476 A, filed May 8, 1914, serial no. 837,130 Divided – US 1335476 A application filed June 1, 1916, serial no. 101,145)
1917: US 1344574 A – "Music-Roll-Controlling-Mechanism" (Note: Gazette, Vol. 275, June 1920, pg. 763 William G. Betz, assignor to Straube Piano Company "Music-Roll-Controlling Mechanism" US 1344574 A, filed February 7, 1917, serial no. 147,136, granted June 22, 1920)
1918: US 1389290 A – "Piano Action" (Note: Gazette, Vol. 289, August 1921, pg. 895 William G. Betz, assignor to Straube Piano Company "Piano Action" US 1389290 A Archived 2025-08-14 at the Wayback Machine, filed April 15, 1918, serial no. 228,631, granted August 30, 1921)
1921: US 1444364 A – "Automatic Music-Roll Carrier and Centering Device for Pneumatic Musical Instruments" (Note: Gazette, Vol. 307, February 1923, pg. 148 William G. Betz, assignor to Straube Piano Company "Automatic Music-Roll Carrier and Centering Device for Pneumatic Musical Instruments" US 1444364 A, filed February 12, 1921, serial no. 444,446, granted February 6, 1923)
1922: US 1574863 A – "String Plate for Grands Pianos" (Note: Gazette, Vol. 344, March 1926, pg. 111 William G. Betz, assignor to Straube Piano Company "String Plate for Grands Pianos" US 1574863 A Archived 2025-08-14 at the Wayback Machine, filed July 17, 1922, serial no. 575,554, serial no. 51,690, granted March 2, 1926)
1925: US 1686726 A – "Grand Piano" (frame construction) (Note: Gazette, Vol. 375, October 1928, pg. 318 William G. Betz, assignor to Straube Piano Company Grand Piano (frame construction) Archived 2015-09-24 at the Wayback Machine US 1686726 A Archived 2025-08-14 at the Wayback Machine, filed August 21, 1925, granted October 9, 1928)
1926: US 1174807 A – "String Plate" (string mounting construction) (Note: Gazette, Vol. 396, July 1930, pg. 215 William G. Betz "String Plate" (string mounting construction) US 1769284 A Archived 2025-08-14 at the Wayback Machine, filed September 30, 1926, serial no. 138, 762, granted July 1, 1930)

Assignments to Straube
1920: US 1335476 A – assigned to Straube Piano Company
1920: US 1344574 A – assigned to Straube Piano Company
1921: US 1389290 A – assigned to Straube Piano Company
1921: US 1444364 A – assigned to Straube Piano Company
1922: US 1574863 A – assigned to Straube Piano Company
