= John Church Company Building =

- U.S. National Register of Historic Places
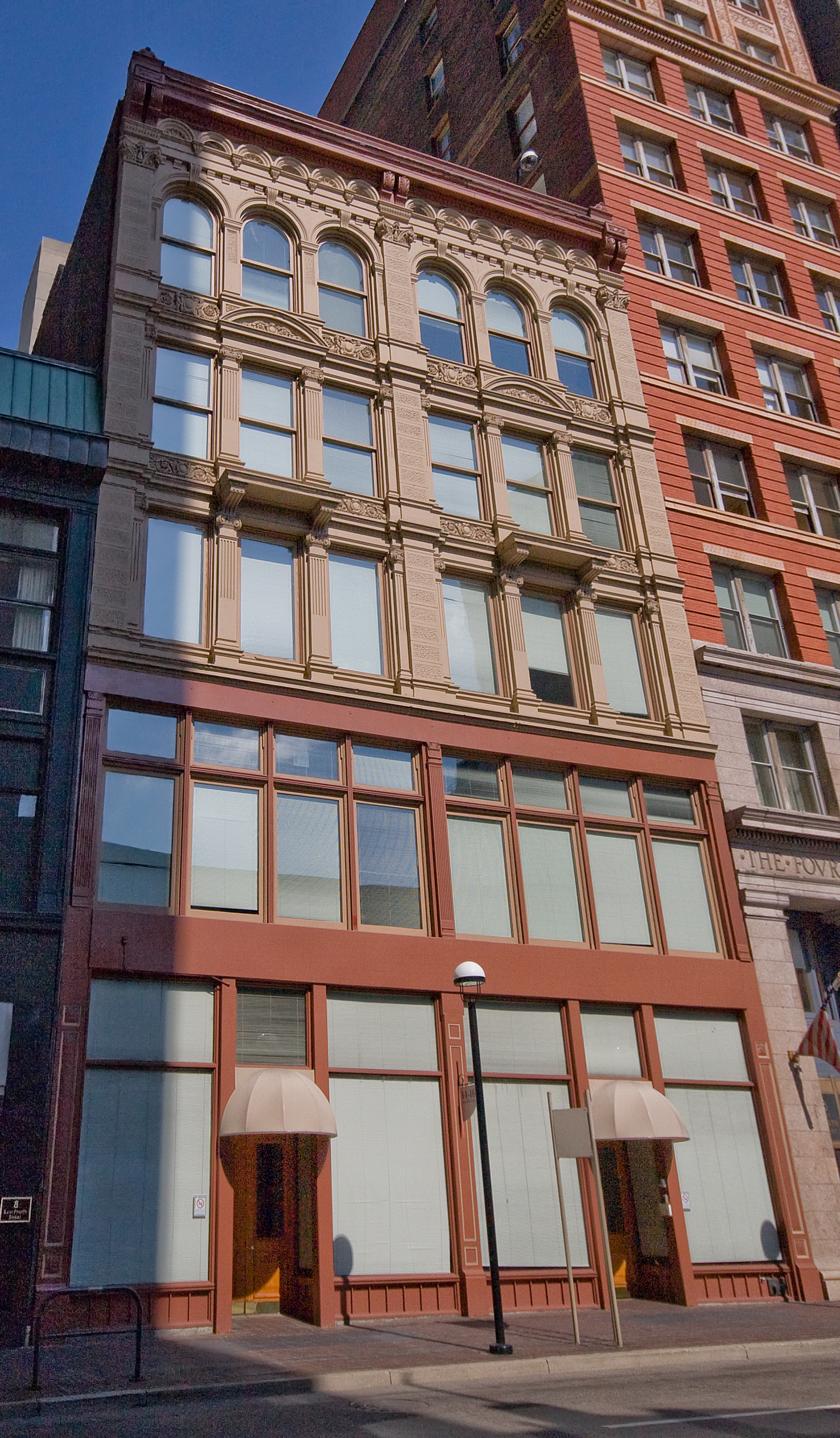
- Front of the building

- Location within Ohio Location within the United States
- Location: 14-16 E. Fourth St., Cincinnati, Ohio
- Coordinates: 39°6′1″N 84°30′43″W
- Area: Less than 1 acre (0.40 ha)
- Built: 1885
- Architect: Samuel Hannaford
- Architectural style: Renaissance Revival
- MPS: Samuel Hannaford & Sons TR
- NRHP reference No.: 94000592
- Added to NRHP: June 17, 1994

The John Church Company Building is a historic commercial building in downtown Cincinnati, Ohio, United States. Designed by one of Cincinnati's most prominent architects, it was home to one of the country's leading vendors of sheet music and musical instruments, and it has been named a historic site.

== History ==
John Church Jr. established the company in 1859, and after taking partners into the firm, he incorporated it in 1885. Among the company's leading ventures was the marketing of pianos produced by the Everett Piano Company of Boston, Massachusetts, which was functionally a wholly owned subsidiary. Other subsidiary companies included Cincinnati's Royal Manufacturing Company, which produced smaller musical instruments such as drums, violins, guitars, mandolins, and banjos. These firms had been separate until 1892, when they were consolidated under one management in order to expand their influence over the broader world of music business.

Besides musical instruments, the John Church Company published large amounts of sheet music; by the late 1870s, they were the largest music publishing house in Cincinnati and all of Ohio, and one of the largest in the United States. Composers they published included John Philip Sousa. Among their titles were educational works such as the "School of Singing" and religious works such as "Choir and Congregation", in addition to other publications in all fields of contemporary music. Theodore Presser Company acquired the John Church Company in 1930.

Built in 1885 on a foundation of limestone, the John Church Company Building is a primarily brick and stone structure in the Renaissance Revival style; its roof is rubber, and it features some elements of iron and steel. The five-story facade is divided into two sections of three bays each, with storefronts on the first floor and windows higher up, and topped with a decorative cornice. Although one of its neighbors is just three stories tall, it is substantially smaller than many of the surrounding buildings. Their building was designed by Samuel Hannaford, a leading Cincinnati architect responsible for designing many of the city's most significant buildings, including Cincinnati Music Hall. As a work of a prominent architect, the building was listed on the National Register of Historic Places in 1994; it is one of dozens of Hannaford designs listed on the National Register.
