= Hohman Avenue Commercial Historic District =

Historic district in Indiana, United States

- U.S. National Register of Historic Places
- U.S. Historic district
- Location within Indiana Location within the United States
- Location: Approximately three blocks lining Hohman Ave. between Clinton St. and Rimbach St., Hammond, Indiana
- Coordinates: 41°37′02″N 87°31′19″W
- Area: 6 acres (2.4 ha)
- Architect: Bump, Edward; Berry, Addison
- Architectural style: Romanesque Revival, Classical Revival, Colonial Revival
- NRHP reference No.: 11000118
- Added to NRHP: March 21, 2011

Hohman Avenue Commercial Historic District is a national historic district located at Hammond, Indiana. The district encompasses 15 contributing buildings in the central business district of Hammond. It developed between about 1904 and 1956, and includes notable example of Romanesque Revival, Classical Revival, and Colonial Revival style architecture. Notable buildings include Knott's Apartments (1904), Emmerling Ambulance Garage (1918), Emmerling Building (1918), St. Joseph's Roman Catholic Church Complex (Church, 1912–1914; Rectory, c. 1915; Hall, 1956), LaSalle Hotel (aka Hotel Mee, 1908), OK Building (1913), and the Hammond National Bank (aka Ruff Building, 1911).

It was listed in the National Register of Historic Places in 2011.
