= Everett Piano Company =

Piano manufacturing company

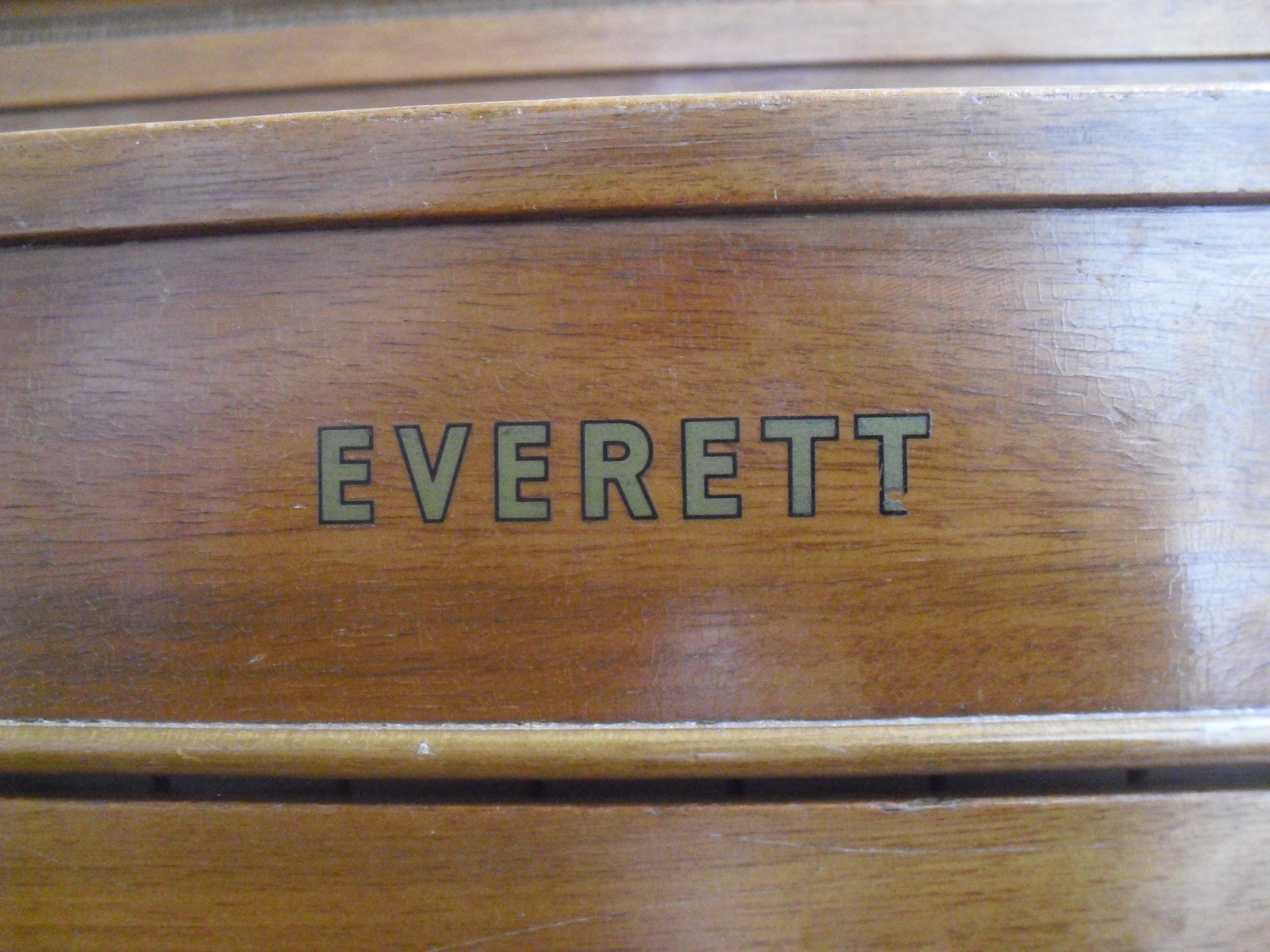
- Industry: Piano designing/manufacturing
- Founded: 1883
- Founder: John J. Church Company
- Defunct: September 1973
- Headquarters: South Haven, Michigan, United States
- Products: Pianos
- Owner: Yamaha Corporation
- Parent: John J. Church Company

The Everett Piano Company, or simply Everett Piano, was a piano manufacturing company founded by the John Church Company. It was later acquired by Yamaha.

== History ==
It was founded in 1883 in Boston, Massachusetts by the John Church Company, which was at the time, one of the leading companies of the industry. In June 1926, Everett merged with Cable-Nelson Piano, moving from Boston to South Haven, Michigan.

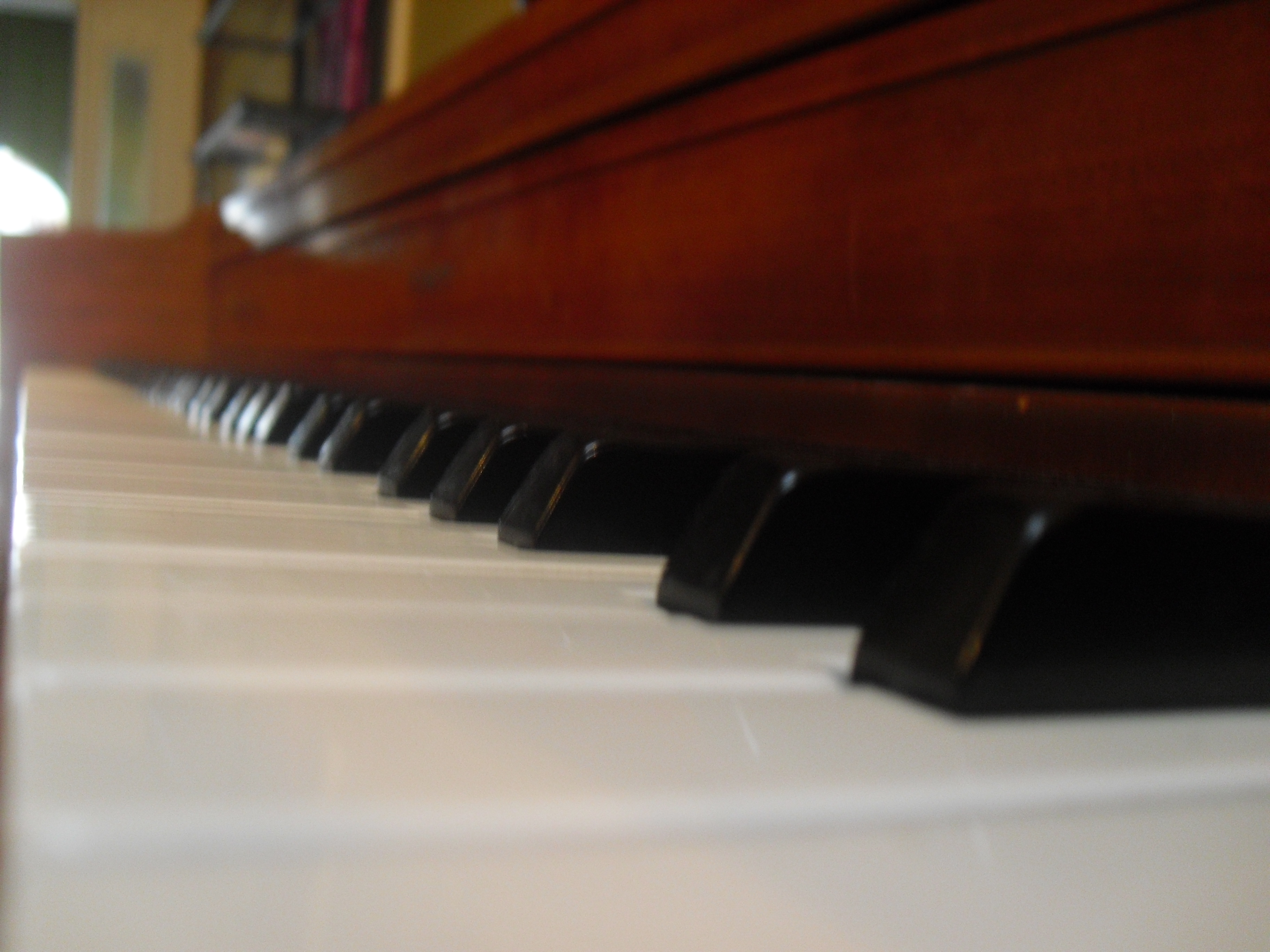
An Everett piano keyboard.

Many composers used Everett's pianos, but the demand for small pianos grew. In response, Everett made only small pianos in 1946, leaving the manufacturing of grand pianos.

In 1936, Everett subsequently joined the Meridan Corporation, where George H. Stapely, a graduate engineer, innovated Everett's old pianos. One of those innovations was the Balanced Tension Back. It allowed the sound quality to stay sharp in different conditions. Stapely became president and lead the company with full ownership.

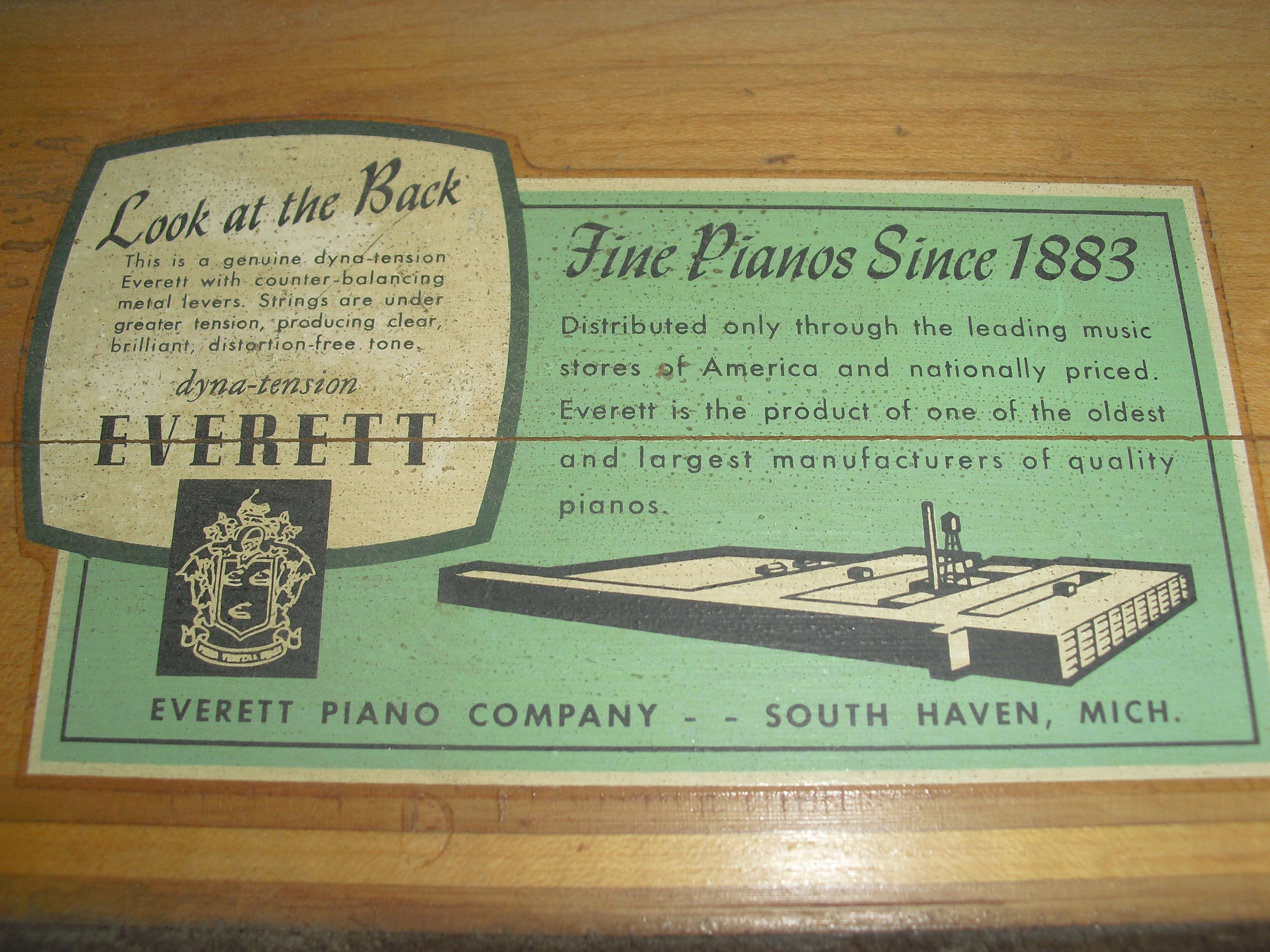
The sign that states that the piano has the dyna-tension scale.

Everett also pioneered the electrostatic reed organ, manufacturing the Orgatron brand from 1935 to 1941, before suspending production for World War II, transferring the business to the Rudolph Wurlitzer Company, and refocusing on pianos.

In 1949, John A. Hens developed the dyna-tension scale. This put the piano strings under greater tension to allow better sound. Only Everett pianos that had Balanced Tension Back had this feature.

On May 29, 1954, Everett was officially purchased by the Meridan Corporation, a Chicago based operating company. At the time, the president of Meridan was George A. Fry. Stapely continued as president of Everett Piano Company, Division of Meridan Corporation.

In 1962, Hammond Organ Company acquired Everett Piano Company to enter the piano industry. Then in 1973, Yamaha bought Everett Piano Company, and manufactured both Yamaha and Everett pianos in South Haven. When Yamaha moved its piano production to a plant in Thomaston, Georgia in 1986, Everett pianos were continued to be manufactured in South Haven by Baldwin Piano and Organ Company, by the contract with Yamaha. However, this contract was subsequently discontinued, and the company finally came to an end in 1989.

== See also ==
- Orgatron
