= Astronaut ranks and positions =

Astronauts hold a variety of ranks and positions. Each of these roles carries responsibilities that are essential to the operation of a spacecraft. A spacecraft's cockpit, filled with sophisticated equipment, requires skills differing from those used to manage the scientific equipment on board, and so on.

== NASA ranks and positions ==
=== Ranks ===
Members of the NASA Astronaut Corps hold one of two ranks. Astronaut Candidate is the rank of those training to be NASA astronauts.

Upon graduation from training, candidates are promoted to Astronaut and receive their Astronaut Pin. The pin is issued in two grades, silver and gold, with the silver pin awarded to candidates who have successfully completed astronaut training and the gold pin to astronauts who have flown in space.

Chief of the Astronaut Office is a position, not a rank.

=== Positions ===
Position	Duties	Examples	Comments
Mercury
Pilot	Overall mission success	Mercury Seven	As a single-seat spacecraft, the astronauts who flew the Mercury missions were referred to simply as "Pilots". Mercury Pilots were required to have experience as a pilot of high-performance jet aircraft and to be no more than 5 feet 11 inches (180 cm) tall and weigh no more than 180 pounds (82 kg).
Gemini
Command Pilot	Overall mission success, safety of crew and spacecraft	James McDivitt	McDivitt was the first rookie Command Pilot.
Pilot	Serves as systems engineer, copilot, and would perform any other mission objectives such as EVA's during the Gemini program.	Ed White	White was the first American who made an EVA (extravehicular activity).
Apollo
Commander	Overall mission success, safety of crew and spacecraft, pilot in command of spacecraft during launch, trans-lunar coast, and Earth return coast. Also pilot in command of the Apollo Lunar Module. The commander would make the actual descent and landing of LM on the lunar surface, as well as the lunar ascent back to the orbiting CSM.	Apollo 11 Commander: Neil Armstrong, first man on the Moon. Apollo 11 Backup Commander: Jim Lovell, Commander of Apollo 13.	
Command Module Pilot	Responsible for knowing the CSM and their systems fully. Serve as flight engineer during launch phase while commander would be in full control of the vehicle. Perform navigation and mid-course correction procedures during trans-lunar and trans-Earth phases of flight, command pilot of CSM during lunar orbit phase (when the mission commander is in control of the lunar module from separation phase until the LM docked back with CSM in lunar orbit). The CM pilot would also have other objectives during lunar orbit phase such as lunar photography, research and study for future landing sites for subsequent Apollo missions, deploy lunar satellite in some cases, as well as being responsible for relaying messages from mission control if radio contact with the LM was lost or weak, and also responsible for performing an orbital rescue with the LM if it were to malfunction and not be able to perform as needed to rendezvous with CSM as planned for in normal cases, but this never was needed. However, the CM pilot was responsible for docking the two ships together when the LM returned to orbit after being on the surface. On later J-series missions, the CM pilot would conduct an EVA on the return voyage to collect film canisters in the SIM bay.	Michael Collins, Backup CMP: William Anders	
Lunar Module Pilot	Flight engineer of Apollo Lunar Module during descent and ascent of the LM also responsible for its systems during all phases of flight between Earth and Moon. The LMP would callout key information to the commander during the most critical descent and landing phases when all of the commander's attention would be focused out the window and on visually flying the LM to a suitable landing spot on the surface. He would also control the navigation computer and other subsystems of the craft while the commander had hands on the controls to fly the ship down manually the last portion of the descent when manual control was taken over from the computer.	Buzz Aldrin, second man on the Moon; Backup LMP: Fred Haise	Aldrin was the first person in space with a doctorate
Docking Module Pilot		Deke Slayton, Mercury 7 astronaut, Backup DMP: Jack Lousma	Position only used once during Apollo–Soyuz joint mission
Skylab
Commander	Overall mission success, safety of crew and spacecraft	Pete Conrad, first Skylab commander	
Pilot		Paul J. Weitz	
Science Pilot		Joseph P. Kerwin, first American physician in space	
Space Shuttle
Commander (CDR)	Overall mission success, safety of crew and Shuttle, maneuvered Shuttle with assistance from Pilot.	John Young, commander of the first Shuttle mission	All Shuttle commanders had prior spaceflight experience. (Note: Joe Engle was the only exception as he flew on STS-2 without prior NASA spaceflight experience, but had flown the X-15 into space (by air force standards) and had participated in the Shuttle Approach and Landing Tests. Following STS-2, NASA required all space shuttle commanders to have prior spaceflight experience.) Required a degree in engineering, biological science, physical science, or mathematics. Must have had at least 1000 hours flying experience on a jet aircraft, and at least 750 simulated landings in the Shuttle Training Aircraft. Must pass a NASA Class I space physical to be certified for flight.
Pilot (PLT)	Assists the Commander in maneuvering the Shuttle. May have also been responsible for release and recovery of satellites.	Robert Crippen, flew the first Space Shuttle mission as pilot	Same education and flight experience requirements as a Commander, but does not need prior spaceflight experience.
Payload Commander (PLC)	A Mission Specialist with additional responsibility for the management of the science or other major payload elements of the mission.	Story Musgrave, Michael P. Anderson	Payload Commanders were always NASA astronauts.
Mission Specialist (MS)	An astronaut assigned to a Shuttle crew with mission-specific duties.	Jerry L. Ross and Franklin Chang-Diaz each flew seven times as Shuttle Mission Specialists.	Must pass a NASA Class II space physical to be certified for flight.
Flight Engineer (FE)	A Mission Specialist with additional responsibility for assisting the Commander and Pilot during ascent and landing. The FE kept track of information from CAPCOM and called out milestones.	Story Musgrave, Sally Ride, Michael P. Anderson, Steven Hawley	The FE is always mission specialist 2 (MS-2) and sits in seat 4 on the Shuttle flight deck for both launch and landing.
Payload Specialist (PS)	Technical experts who accompanied specific payloads such as a commercial or scientific satellites.	Byron K. Lichtenberg, first payload specialist; Ulf Merbold, first international payload specialist; Charles Walker, flew three times; Ilan Ramon, last payload specialist	Payload Specialists were non-NASA personnel. The term was also applied to representatives from partner nations such as Saudi Arabia and Mexico who were given the opportunity to fly on the Space Shuttle. This position was discontinued in 2003 following the Columbia disaster.
Educator Mission Specialist	Same as mission specialist but with additional education-related duties.	Joseph M. Acaba, first Puerto Rican astronaut; Richard R. Arnold; Dorothy Metcalf-Lindenburger	Position created in 2004 as part of the Educator Astronaut Project.
International Mission Specialist	Same as mission specialist but may have had payload-specific duties assigned by home agency.	Hans Schlegel	
USAF Manned Spaceflight Engineer	Same as payload specialist, but were military personnel who accompanied military payloads.	Gary Payton, William A. Pailes	Payton and Pailes were the only Manned Spaceflight Engineers to fly before the program's termination in 1988.
Spaceflight Participant	People who travel aboard space missions coordinated by those agencies who are not part of the crew.	Christa McAuliffe, Teacher in Space Project, Space Shuttle Challenger disaster	This term serves to distinguish tourists and other special travelers from the career astronauts.
Commercial Crew Program
Spacecraft Commander	Overall mission success, safety of crew and spacecraft, manages ascent and entry	Douglas G. Hurley, Demo-2	
Joint Operations Commander	Manages rendezvous, docking, and undocking with the ISS, and quiescent operations while docked	Robert L. Behnken, Demo-2	Position only used once during the Demo-2 mission.
Pilot	Assist the Spacecraft Commander in maneuvering the capsule.	Victor Glover, Crew-1	Used on NASA contracted Crew Dragon flights starting with Crew-1.
Mission Specialist	A NASA or affiliated astronaut with mission-specific duties.	Soichi Noguchi, first Crew Dragon Mission Specialist, Shannon Walker, Crew-1	Used on NASA contracted Crew Dragon flights starting with Crew-1.
Artemis program
Commander	Overall mission success, safety of crew and spacecraft.	Reid Wiseman, Artemis II	
Pilot	Responsible for manually piloting the spacecraft and assisting and coordinating with the Commander.	Victor Glover, Artemis II	
Mission Specialist 1	Responsible for the side hatch operations and the toilet. This role will also perform health-related experiments and managing mission objectives.	Christina Koch, Artemis II	
Mission Specialist 2	Mission Specialist 2 will be responsible for the navigation and spacecraft operations during the mission. Carrying a tablet on ascent and entry, this role can access and monitor spacecraft systems during key phases of ascent and entry.	Jeremy Hansen, Artemis II	

== Roscosmos and Soviet space program ranks and positions ==
=== Ranks ===
Cosmonauts are professional space travellers from Russia. After initial training, cosmonauts are assigned as either a test cosmonaut (Russian: космонавт испытатель, romanized: kosmonavt ispytatel) or a research cosmonaut (Russian: космонавт исследователь, romanized: kosmonavt issledovatel). A test cosmonaut has a more difficult preparation than a research cosmonaut and can serve as the commander or the flight engineer of a spacecraft, while a research cosmonaut cannot.

Higher ranks include pilot cosmonaut, test cosmonaut instructor, and research cosmonaut instructor.

Pilot-Cosmonaut of the Russian Federation is a title that is presented to all cosmonauts who fly for the Russian space program.

=== Positions ===
Position	Duties	Examples	Comments
Vostok
Pilot Cosmonaut	Overall mission success	Yuri Gagarin, the first man in space	As a single-seat spacecraft, the cosmonaut who flew the Vostok missions were referred to simply as "Pilot Cosmonauts".
Voskhod
Commander	Overall mission success, safety of crew and spacecraft	Vladimir Komarov, commanded the first multi-person flight	
Second Pilot		Alexei Leonov, the first person to perform a spacewalk	
Scientist Cosmonaut		Konstantin Feoktistov, the first engineer in space	
Doctor Cosmonaut		Boris Yegorov, the first doctor in space	
Soyuz
Commander	Overall mission success, safety of crew and spacecraft	Vladimir Dzhanibekov, commander of missions to Salyut 6 and Salyut 7 space stations	
Flight Engineer	One or two flight engineers per mission. Assist commander and perform mission-specific duties	Svetlana Savitskaya, the first female to perform a spacewalk	
Spaceflight Participant	No official duties	Sheikh Muszaphar Shukor, first Malaysian in space; Dennis Tito, first fee-paying space tourist	Term used for Soyuz passengers who are not part of the crew, and serves to distinguish tourists and other special travelers from the career astronauts.

== China National Space Administration positions ==
=== Ranks ===
Similarly to NASA, members of the China Manned Space Agency (CMSA) hold one of two ranks. Astronaut Candidate is the rank of those training to be CNSA astronauts. Upon graduation, candidates are promoted to Astronaut.

The positions of Spacecraft Pilot, Flight Engineer, and Mission Payload Specialist were listed in the announcement for the Group 3 selection.

=== Positions ===
Position	Duties	Examples	Comments
Shenzhou
Commander (指挥长)	The Commander is primarily responsible for the whole mission and safety of the crew. Also, this role will serve as the primary spacecraft pilot.	Yang Liwei, Shenzhou 5	This role is always designated as Astronaut 01.
Spacecraft Pilot (航天驾驶员)	This role is responsible for spacecraft driving and navigation. They are experts in the spacecraft, and has the ability to take over if the main pilot is unable to pilot the spacecraft. This is the most common rank in Taikonaut Batches.	Jing Haipeng, Shenzhou 16	Although this role is also a rank in astronaut groups. Spacecraft Pilots can also take the role of Operator or System Operator. Flight Engineers can take the role of spacecraft pilot if that role is designated as Astronaut 02. In Shenzhou 23, the role was used as its own rank. They have the responsibility of the operator but used Spacecraft Pilot as the official role.
Flight Engineer (飞行工程师)	The Flight Engineer is responsible for the care of the space station platform which focuses on subsystems. This role can also conduct experiments and extravehicular operations.	Zhu Yangzhu, Shenzhou 16	This role can be designated as either Astronaut 02 or Astronaut 03 depending on the mission. In the case that Astronaut 02 is a Flight Engineer, this role would serve as the backup if the primary spacecraft pilot is unable to.
Orbital Module Astronaut (轨道舱宇航员)	The Orbital Module Astronaut is responsible for assisting the lead spacewalker inside the orbital module. This role wore an Orlan-M suit during the activity.	Liu Boming (astronaut), Shenzhou 7	This role appeared only once. Although this role was designated as Astronaut 02, he was seated in the Astronaut 03 seat.
Descent Module Monitor Astronaut (下降舱监测宇航员)	The Descent Module Monitor Astronaut was responsible for being the Intravehicular Officer guiding the two spacewalkers inside the Shenzhou Capsule. This role also maintained the Descent Module operations.	Jing Haipeng, Shenzhou 7	This role appeared only once. Although the designation was Astronaut 03, he sat at the Astronaut 02 seat
Operator (操作员)	This role handled the mission-specific objectives in missions, primarily focusing on science and mission related duties. This role was also the immediate backup to the primary spacepilot.	Chen Dong, Shenzhou 11	The Operator is always designated as Astronaut 02. The role evolved from the construction phase and the application and development phase, however their duties in conducting science and mission operations are still the main duties ever since.
System Operator (系统操作员)	The System Operator is ultimately responsible for the in-orbit maintenance care and material management. This role also will conduct experiments.	Tang Hongbo, Shenzhou 12	This role was introduced in the whole construction phase missions of the space station and was introduced again in the application and development phase.
Payload Specialist (载荷专家)	The Payload Specialist is responsible for the management of payloads as well as performing experiments and improving research efficiency aboard the space station.	Gui Haichao, Shenzhou 16	This role is taken by civilians, doctors, researchers, and university professors. Also, this role is designated as Astronaut 03

== International Space Station positions ==
Position	Duties	Examples	Comments
Commander	Overall mission success, safety of crew and station	Peggy Whitson, first female commander	
Flight Engineer	Overall mission success, science	Robert Thirsk, first Canadian astronaut to be part of an ISS expedition	
Science Officer	Primary responsibility for station's science experiments. A secondary position for an ISS flight engineer.	Peggy Whitson, first science officer	Position established in 2002 by NASA to reinforce science aspect of ISS.
Spaceflight Participant	No formal duties.	Anousheh Ansari, first female space tourist	Term used for ISS visitors who are not part of the crew and serves to distinguish tourists and other special travelers from the career astronauts.

== See also ==
- NASA Astronaut Groups – the phases of astronaut selection
