= Kyle Allen =

Kyle Allen may refer to:

- Kyle Allen (American football) (born 1996), American football quarterback
- Kyle Allen (actor) (born 1994), American actor and ballet dancer

== See also ==
- Allen (surname)
