= Barbara Morgan =

American teacher and former astronaut (born 1951)

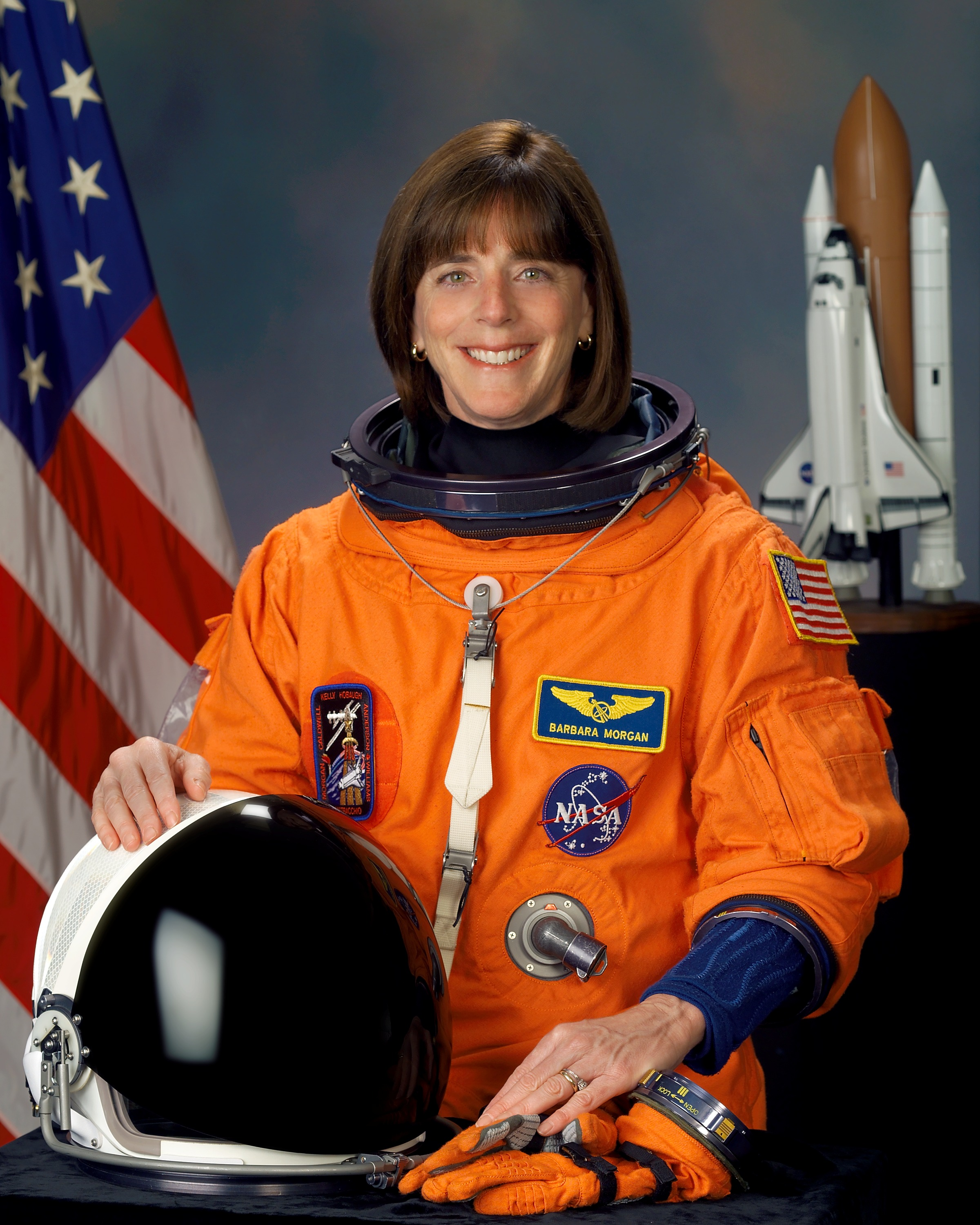
- Morgan in 2006
- Born: Barbara Radding; November 28, 1951 (age 74); Fresno, California, U.S.
- Education: Stanford University (BS)
- Spouse: Clay Morgan
- Children: 2
- Space career

NASA astronaut
- Time in space: 12d 17h 53m
- Selection: Teacher in Space Project (1985); NASA Group 17 (1998)
- Missions: STS-118

Barbara Radding Morgan (born November 28, 1951) is an American teacher and a former NASA astronaut. She participated in the Teacher in Space Project as backup to Christa McAuliffe for the 1986 ill-fated STS-51-L mission of the Space Shuttle Challenger. In 1998, eight years after the Teacher in Space Project had ended, she was selected by NASA as an astronaut candidate, training as a mission specialist; astronaut Morgan flew on STS-118 in August 2007. As such, she became the first teacher (by original career) to go into space.

== Early life and education ==
Morgan was born to Dr. and Mrs. Jerry Radding in 1951 and raised in Fresno, California, where she attended Herbert Hoover High School. Following graduation in 1969, she was accepted to Stanford University in Palo Alto, California, where she graduated with distinction in 1973 with a B.A. in Human Biology. She obtained her teaching credential from Notre Dame de Namur University in nearby Belmont in 1974.

== Teaching career since 1974 ==
Morgan began her teaching career in 1974 on the Flathead Indian Reservation at Arlee Elementary School in Arlee, Montana, where she taught remedial reading and math. From 1975 to 1978, she taught remedial reading/math and second grade at McCall-Donnelly Elementary School in McCall, Idaho. From 1978 to 1979, Morgan taught English and science to third graders at Colegio Americano de Quito in Quito, Ecuador, for a year. From 1979 to 1998, Morgan taught second, third, and fourth grades at McCall-Donnelly Elementary School.

== Teacher in Space Project ==
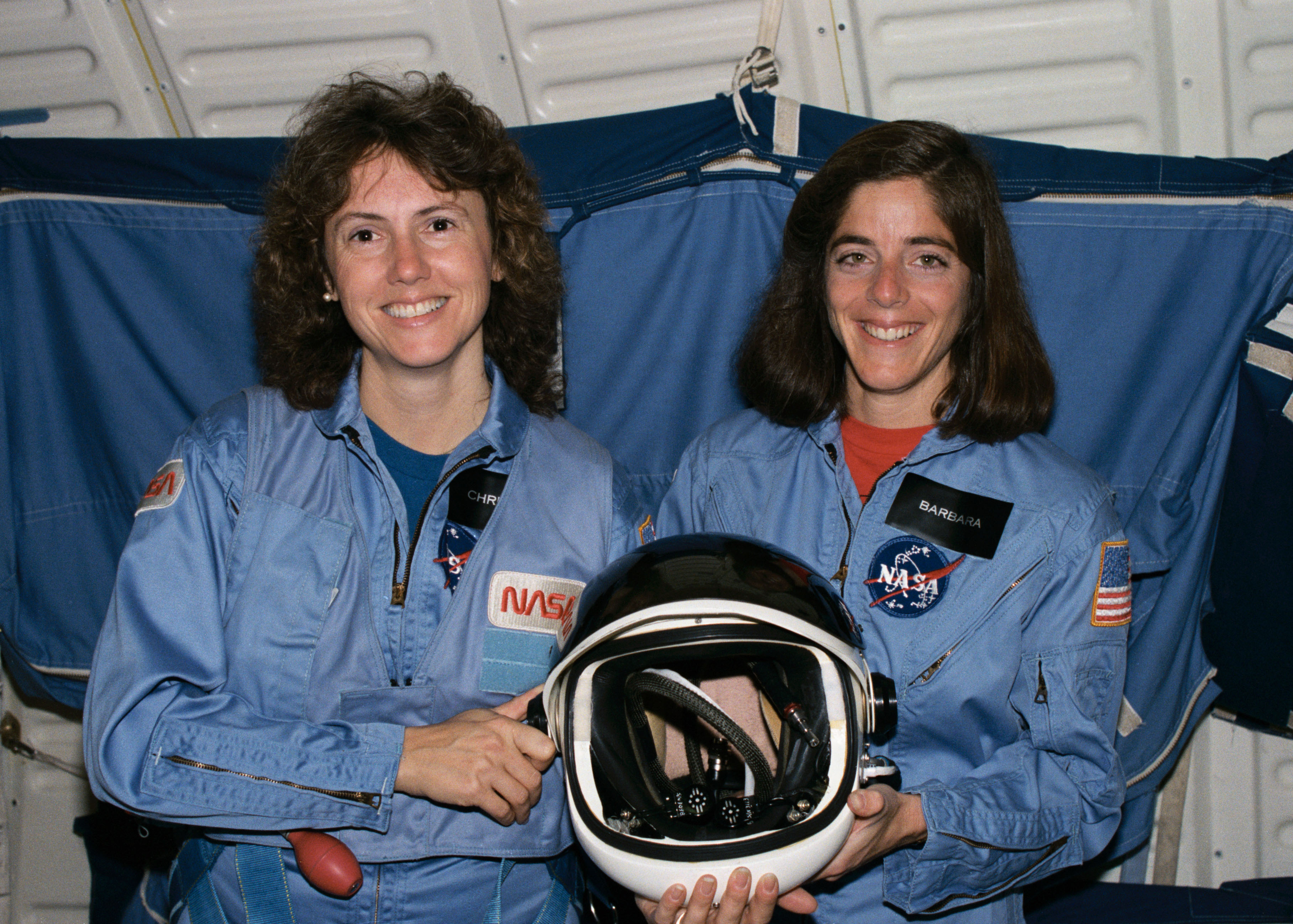
Christa McAuliffe and Morgan in December 1985

Morgan was selected as the backup candidate for the NASA Teacher in Space Project on July 19, 1985. From September 1985 to January 1986, Morgan trained with Christa McAuliffe and the Space Shuttle Challenger crew at NASA's Johnson Space Center, Houston, Texas. Following McAuliffe's death in the Challenger disaster, Morgan assumed the duties of Teacher in Space Designee. From March 1986 to July 1986, she worked with NASA, speaking to educational organizations throughout the country.

In the fall of 1986, Morgan returned to Idaho to resume her teaching career. She taught second and third grades at McCall-Donnelly Elementary and continued to work with NASA's Education Division, Office of Human Resources and Education. Her duties as Teacher in Space Designee included public speaking, educational consulting, curriculum design, and serving on the National Science Foundation's Federal Task Force for Women and Minorities in Science and Engineering.

== NASA career ==
In January 1998, 12 years after McAuliffe's death, Morgan was selected by NASA as an astronaut candidate (mission specialist) and reported to the Johnson Space Center in August 1998 to begin training to become a full-time astronaut. Following the completion of two years of training and evaluation, she was assigned technical duties in the Astronaut Office Space Station Operations Branch. She served in the Astronaut Office CAPCOM Branch, working in Mission Control as prime communicator with on-orbit crews.

Like many other astronauts and cosmonauts, Morgan had been a licensed amateur radio operator, KD5VNP, having passed the technician class license exam in 2003 (the license expired in 2013). This qualified her to use the facilities of the Amateur Radio on the International Space Station (ARISS) project.

Morgan was initially scheduled to fly on the STS-118 mission on Space Shuttle Columbia in November 2004. During the disaster that destroyed Columbia in February 2003, she was aboard a training chase plane that was following the shuttle as it prepared to land. As a result of the disaster, STS-118 was delayed until 2007 and was moved to Endeavour.

Morgan's duties as a mission specialist were no different than those of other crew members. While NASA press releases and media briefings often referred to her as a "mission specialist educator" or "educator astronaut", Morgan did not train in the Educator Astronaut Project. NASA Administrator Michael D. Griffin clarified at a press conference after STS-118 that Morgan was not considered a mission specialist educator, but rather was a standard mission specialist, who had been a teacher.

Prior to her flight on STS-118, NASA seemed to limit Morgan's exposure to the press, but she did a series of interviews shortly before the start of the mission about what the crew of STS-118 would be doing to help build the International Space Station, commenting, "You know, there's a great sense of pride to be able to be involved in a human endeavor that takes us all a little bit farther. When you look down and see our Earth, and you realize what we are trying to do as a human race, it's pretty profound."

Three weeks after Morgan's mission ended, she conducted her first space education assignment at Walt Disney World in Florida. Morgan's words from that day were etched into a plaque on a wall of Mission: Space. The "Wall of Honor" contains quotes from notable people, such as Neil Armstrong, John F. Kennedy, Charles Lindbergh, Stephen Hawking, Carl Sagan, Galileo, and Christa McAuliffe. Morgan's plaque is placed beside McAuliffe's, which says: "Space is for everybody ... That's our new frontier out there." This event was one of a series of lectures Morgan would complete.

=== Spaceflight experience ===
STS-118, an assembly mission to the International Space Station, successfully launched from Florida's Kennedy Space Center at 6:36:42 p.m. EDT, 8 August 2007. Morgan served as robotic arm operator and transfer coordinator, coordinating the transfer of over 5,000 pounds (2,300 kg) of cargo to the International Space Station, and bringing home over 3,000 pounds (1,400 kg). In addition to her other duties, Morgan participated in twenty-minute amateur radio question-and-answer sessions with young people at the Discovery Center of Idaho and other centers, and joined Mission Specialist Alvin Drew in an education event with young people at the Challenger Center for Space Science Education in Alexandria, Virginia. The event was hosted by June Scobee, widow of Space Shuttle Challenger's commander, Richard "Dick" Scobee. The center honored Morgan with the President George H.W. Bush Leadership Award. STS-118 landed successfully at Kennedy Space Center on August 21, a day ahead of schedule due to concerns about Hurricane Dean.

== Post-NASA career ==
On June 28, 2008, Morgan announced that she would leave NASA for a teaching job at Boise State University. In August 2008, Morgan took a full-time position as a distinguished educator in residence; a dual appointment to BSU's colleges of engineering and education. There she advises, leads and represents the university in policy development, advocacy and fund-raising in science, technology, engineering and math.

On July 4, 2008, Morgan received the "Friend of Education" award from the National Education Association. The following month, Barbara R. Morgan Elementary School opened in McCall, Idaho.

In 2008 she appeared in the Discovery Channel documentary miniseries When We Left Earth.

She appeared on the 2020 Netflix documentary miniseries Challenger: The Final Flight.

== Awards and honors ==
Morgan received the Adler Planetarium Women in Space Science Award in 2008. She was awarded the Frank J. Malina Astronautics Medal by the International Astronautical Federation for her contributions to space science education in 2009.

Actress Mary Chris Wall portrayed Morgan in the 1990 television film Challenger.

== Personal life ==
Morgan is married to writer Clay Morgan of McCall, Idaho; they have two sons. She is a classical flutist who also enjoys jazz, literature, hiking, swimming, and cross-country skiing.
