= The Map of Tiny Perfect Things =

2021 film by Ian Samuels

- Official release poster
- Directed by: Ian Samuels
- Screenplay by: Lev Grossman
- Based on: "The Map of Tiny Perfect Things" by Lev Grossman
- Produced by: Akiva Goldsman; Gregory Lessans; Aaron Ryder; Ashley Fox
- Starring: Kyle Allen; Kathryn Newton
- Cinematography: Andrew Wehde
- Edited by: Andrea Bottigliero
- Music by: Tom Bromley
- Production companies: FilmNation Entertainment; Wishmore Entertainment; Weed Road Pictures
- Distributed by: Amazon Studios
- Release date: February 12, 2021
- Running time: 99 minutes
- Country: United States
- Language: English

The Map of Tiny Perfect Things is a 2021 American science fiction romantic comedy film directed by Ian Samuels, from a screenplay by Lev Grossman, based on his 2016 short story of the same name. It stars Kathryn Newton and Kyle Allen as two teenagers stuck in a time loop.

The film was released through Amazon Prime Video on February 12, 2021. It received positive reviews from critics and was nominated for the Critics' Choice Award for Best Movie Made for Television.

== Plot ==
Mark, a teenage boy, has been stuck in a time loop, repeating the same day over and over again. After many iterations of the loop, Mark has perfected several routines and is able to aid other people by anticipating their movements. Developing a crush on a girl he gives directions to, Mark goes to the community pool to meet her again, saving her from being knocked into the pool by a beach ball. However, his efforts to spend more time with her are constantly frustrated. One day, while Mark is waiting to save the girl from the beach ball, another girl, Margaret, unexpectedly intervenes. Mark tracks her down and discovers that she is also living in the same time loop.

Mark and Margaret spend time together. Mark tells her about his desire to go to art school, and his father quitting his job to write a book on the Civil War; she talks about her dream of working as a mission specialist for NASA, and how she has been looking for a missing dog. They become close. Mark brings up possible ways they could break the time loop, but Margaret is not interested in trying to escape it. Every evening she hurries off after receiving a text from a medical student named Jared, who Mark speculates must be her boyfriend.

Mark and Margaret decide to look for moments of perfect beauty during the day; Mark conjectures that they might escape the time loop after finding all of them. To cheer Margaret up, Mark creates a mock-up of Tranquility Base in the school gym for her. Later, at his room, she sees a map he has created of the perfect moments. Mark leans in to kiss her, but she avoids the kiss, saying she does not want to be more than friends. The next day, when his dad comes to talk to him about his future, Mark calls him hypocritical for chasing his own dreams while thwarting Mark's. After talking to his sister Emma, Mark learns their dad did not quit his job, but was fired and was too ashamed to reveal it.

Mark suggests to Margaret that they might be able to break the loop if they go far away. They buy tickets to Tokyo, but Margaret leaves the plane before takeoff. When the plane crosses the International Date Line, Mark wakes up in his bedroom, realizing the plan did not work. He decides to focus on others in the next loop. He invites his father to tell him about the Civil War, and attends Emma's soccer game, where she scores a goal that she did not score in the loops when he was not there. While attempting a skateboarding trick, Mark injures himself and is taken to the hospital. There, he sees Margaret visiting her mother, who is dying of cancer. Mark realizes that he is not the center of this story, but rather Margaret is.

Margaret wakes up and manages to find the lost dog she has been searching for. She then has a conversation with Mark's friend Henry, whom Mark has repeatedly confided in about the time loop. After helping Henry win his video game, Margaret has an epiphany. She creates a three-dimensional model of the times and places of the perfect moments using string. The shadow cast by the model creates an image of a four-dimensional cube, with a single vertex missing. She determines that the final event will occur at 7:00 PM at the pool.

Margaret finds Mark sitting alone at the pool and explains that she is responsible for the time loop: this was the last day her mother is alive, and she was not willing to move past it. But she now believes that Mark was caught up in the loop too in order to allow her someone to move on with. The two of them kiss.

Margaret goes to the hospital and says goodbye to her mother for a final time. She and Mark go outside. At midnight it begins to rain, signaling that the loop has been broken. The next morning they finally return the missing dog.

== Cast ==
- Kyle Allen as Mark
- Kathryn Newton as Margaret
- Jermaine Harris as Henry
- Anna Mikami as Phoebe
- Josh Hamilton as Daniel
- Cleo Fraser as Emma
- Jorja Fox as Greta
- Al Madrigal as Mr. Pepper

== Production ==
In September 2019, it was announced Ian Samuels would direct the film, from a screenplay by Lev Grossman based upon his short story of the same name, with Akiva Goldsman producing the film under his Weed Road Pictures banner, alongside FilmNation Entertainment. In February 2020, Kathryn Newton, Kyle Allen, Jermaine Harris, Anna Mikami, Josh Hamilton and Cleo Fraser joined the cast of the film, with Amazon Studios distributing.

Principal photography began in February 2020. Filming took place in Fairhope and Mobile, Alabama.

== Reception ==
=== Critical response ===
On review aggregator website Rotten Tomatoes, the film holds an approval rating of 77% based on 74 critic reviews, with an average of 6.60/10. The website's critics consensus states, "Its characters' time-loop journey is a little bumpy and fairly familiar, but heartfelt charm and likeable leads make A Map of Tiny Perfect Things worth following." On Metacritic, it has a weighted average score of 61 out of 100, based on 16 critic reviews, indicating "generally favorable reviews". The film ranks on Rotten Tomatoes' Best Science Fiction Movies of 2021.

=== Accolades ===
Year	Award	Category	Nominee(s)	Result	Ref.
2021	Golden Trailer Awards	Best Music	The Map of Tiny Perfect Things, "Love Story", Prime Video, Tiny Hero	Nominated	
2021	Golden Trailer Awards	Best Romance	The Map of Tiny Perfect Things, "Love Story", Prime Video, Tiny Hero	Won	
2021	Golden Trailer Awards	Best BTS/EPK for a Feature Film (Under 2 minutes)	The Map of Tiny Perfect Things, Behind the Scenes, Prime Video, Tiny Hero	Nominated	
2022	Critics' Choice Awards	Best Movie Made for Television	The Map of Tiny Perfect Things (Prime Video)	Nominated	

== Adaptation ==
In 2024, it was adapted into a Thai film Love Stuck starring Teeradon Supapunpinyo and Plearnpichaya Komalarajun on Prime Video.

== See also ==
- List of films featuring time loops
