= The Life List =

2025 film by Adam Brooks

- Promotional poster
- Directed by: Adam Brooks
- Screenplay by: Adam Brooks
- Based on: The Life List by Lori Nelson Spielman
- Produced by: Liza Chasin
- Starring: Sofia Carson; Kyle Allen; Connie Britton
- Cinematography: Florian Ballhaus
- Edited by: Peter Teschner
- Music by: Will Bates
- Production company: 3dot Productions
- Distributed by: Netflix
- Release date: March 28, 2025
- Running time: 125 minutes
- Country: United States
- Language: English

The Life List is a 2025 American romantic comedy drama film, starring Sofia Carson, Kyle Allen, and Connie Britton. It was written and directed by Adam Brooks and adapted from the novel of the same name by Lori Nelson Spielman.

The film was released by Netflix on March 28, 2025. It received mixed reviews from critics.

== Plot ==
After Alex's mother Elizabeth dies of metastatic cancer Alex finds out that in order to gain access to her inheritance, she must complete a list of life goals she came up with as a 13 year old. This is explained through a series of videos left by her mom.

The first video explains that her inheritance will be unlocked after following the life list she wrote at 13, to prevent her from settling into a life out of duty. The executor, young lawyer Brad, will verify that she completed each task and then give her the corresponding video. Alex is also given a four-point true love test by her friend. For someone to pass, 1) she must fully open her heart to them; they must 2) be kind and 3) inspire her to be her best self, and 4) she could imagine having his kids.

Alex shows her boyfriend Finn the list. He then enthusiastically envisions them jointly owning and operating a gaming company. Appalled, she approaches Brad and accepts Elizabeth's challenge.

At a comedy club open mic night, Alex effectively defeats a heckler. She then must get out of her comfort zone daily for a week, so she volunteers as a teacher to high schoolers in a shelter. Encountering difficulties with one, Alex seeks advice from the shelter's coordinator, Garrett, whom she had met recently.

At a peace-making dinner with her estranged father Sam, Alex inadvertently discovers her birth father is musician Johnny. Alex proposes finding him to her brothers. Lucas supports her, but Julian does not.

Alex enlists her childhood piano teacher to learn Clair de Lune, but must later participate in a group recital. Still not connecting with the student, she approaches Garrett again. However, as he must attend a charity event, she tags along. Brad is also there with his girlfriend Nina, who is moving back to NYC. Seeing Patrick Ewing, Alex charms him.

While dating Garrett, Alex persuades Ewing to participate in a hoop-shooting charity event, ticking more items on the list. As their activities are usually Garrett-focused, she convinces him to join a dinner party with her rambunctious friends. Afterwards, they argue because he felt uncomfortable. Garrett accuses her of only being with him to finish the life list, then storms off.

Since Alex no longer has a ride, Brad and Nina drive Alex to Vermont to surprise Johnny. Nina, noting Alex and Brad's chemistry, quietly leaves. At the gig, Johnny approaches them because they were staring. They chat, agreeing to meet in the morning. Alex and Brad go drinking afterward and later get intimate.

In the morning, Johnny fails to show up. Saddened, but unsurprised, they return home in silence. Upon arriving, Alex thanks Brad, and he kisses her. She chastises herself for believing meeting Johnny would fix everything, he praises her. Alex calls their intimacy a mistake, and Brad reveals he and Nina broke up over her. Upset she did not know before they slept together, Alex starts to leave upon seeing Garrett. Brad insists she does not love Garrett, so she angrily leaves.

However, Alex and Garrett break up. Although he says he missed her, she points out that what he had disliked that night in her apartment are essential elements of her.

Lucas gets his siblings to meet at the house under false pretenses, but surprises them with an impromptu campout under the full moon. Both protest, but end up staying. Alex tells them about the Vermont trip, and her brothers reveal they were all envious of her closeness with Elizabeth. So, she shares their mother's videos with them.

Alex finally reconciles with Sam. When she goes to the law office in December, she is surprised that Brad is not there and that she will receive her inheritance, even though the list was not completed. Alex receives the deed to the house. In her final video, Elizabeth asks her to strive for true love, and Alex hugs her.

Alex confesses to Brad that she felt overwhelmed the last time they spoke. Insisting he fulfills the four criteria of the true love test, they embrace. Later, at Alex's New Year's party, Julian thanks their mother for helping them through the year.

== Cast ==
- Sofia Carson as Alex
- Kyle Allen as Brad
- José Zúñiga as Samuel
- Sebastian de Souza as Garrett
- Connie Britton as Elizabeth
- Jordi Mollà as Johnny
- Marianne Rendón as Zoe
- Michael Rowland as Finn
- Chelsea Frei as Megan
- Dario Ladani Sanchez as Lucas
- Federico Rodriguez as Julian
- Rachel Zeiger-Haag as Catherine

In addition, Patrick Ewing has a cameo as himself.

== Production ==
The Life List was directed by Adam Brooks, who also adapted the novel of the same name by Lori Nelson Spielman. It was produced by Liza Chasin from 3dot Productions and Netflix. In March 2024, it was announced that Sofia Carson would lead the cast alongside Kyle Allen, Sebastian de Souza, and Connie Britton. José Zúñiga, Jordi Mollà, Marianne Rendón, and Chelsea Frei joined in April of the same year. Principal photography took place in March 2024, filming locations included Nyack, New York.

== Release ==
The Life List was released on Netflix on March 28, 2025. According to data from Showlabs, The Life List ranked second on Netflix in the United States during the week of 24–30 March 2025. It reached No. 1 in movies on Netflix in the United States the week of April 8, 2025.

== Critical response ==
On the review aggregator website Rotten Tomatoes, 46% of 24 critics' reviews are positive, with an average rating of 5.1/10. The website's consensus reads: "The Life List checks all the romantic comedy boxes with efficiency, but it could've benefitted from squiggling outside the lines here and there." Metacritic, which uses a weighted average, assigned the film a score of 49 out of 100, based on 6 critics, indicating "mixed or average" reviews.
