= The In Between =

- Promotional release poster
- Directed by: Arie Posin
- Written by: Marc Klein
- Produced by: Robbie Brenner; Andrew Deane; Joey King
- Starring: Joey King; Kyle Allen
- Cinematography: Brendan Galvin
- Edited by: Zach Staenberg
- Music by: J.J. Pfeifer
- Production companies: Paramount Players; Industry Entertainment; Robbie Brenner Productions
- Distributed by: Paramount+ (United States); Netflix (International)
- Release date: February 11, 2022
- Running time: 115 minutes
- Country: United States
- Language: English

The In Between is a 2022 American paranormal romance film directed by Arie Posin, written by Marc Klein, and starring Joey King and Kyle Allen.

Tessa survives a car accident which took her boyfriend Skylar's life, but soon realises he is trying to reconnect with her from the beyond.

The film was released on February 11, 2022, on Paramount+ and on April 8, 2022, on Netflix and received mixed reviews from critics.

== Plot ==
In the aftermath of a traffic accident, two young people lie on the road, the girl barely moving and the boy motionless. Tessa wakes up in the hospital.

In a flashback set 182 days before, Tessa spends the morning taking photos in the coastal town, wandering into the local theater to watch a classic French film. Skylar, another person watching it, offers to translate. He is a true romantic; he and Tessa have very different views.

Eighty days later, Tessa is encouraged to apply to RISD for her photography skills. Later, while shooting a rowing meet, she finally finds Skylar again. They both obviously had been searching for each other. Spending the day together, Tessa shows him the world through her eyes. At the Empyrean, an abandoned honeymooners hotel, Skylar teaches her to waltz and they kiss. He tells her he'll return at the end of the month to stay for the summer.

In the present, Tessa is back at school, and is reminded of the RISD deadline. Later, going home, she throws out her developing materials. Her adoptive dad reminds her that her mother never stuck to anything. Dreaming of Skylar, she wakes up to see her Robert Doisneau print of Le baiser de l'hôtel de ville.

Flashback: July 4. After the fireworks, Tessa shows Skylar her darkroom, portfolio and opens up about her mother's abandonment, forcing her into the foster care system. They go out on a boat during the day; he teaches her to row and declares his love, and they make love on the shore.

Tessa tells her friend Shannon about the In Between, the concept of a window of time in which a recently deceased person needs final contact before moving on. While taking the SAT, weirdly Skylar moves her hand on her answer sheet to draw what seems to be a non-sensical scribble. Then their song, 'Never tear us apart' comes up simultaneously on everyone's silenced mobiles.

Flashback: Eleven days before the accident. Skylar angers Tessa for putting a photo she gifted him in an exhibit to show her talent. Her inability to express her feelings comes up. He wants her to realize they could have a future but she continues to hold back. Photographing her adoptive mother, she suggests expressing her feelings out loud.

Shannon helps Tessa try to channel Skylar after reading several books. First they try with a planchette, scrying, and instrumental trans-communication Electronic voice phenomenon. The built-in GPS in her adopted mother's car shows Tessa the same route she had scribbled on her SAT sheet. So, she blows off returning the car to follow it, arriving to 'The In Between' author Doris she met in the hospital. She suggests Tessa seek him where they had their strongest connections.

Flashback: Five days before the accident. Tessa discovers Skylar is going to Oregon to support his father for the year, leaving her on the East coast. Taking it as a sign, as she finally has applied to RISD and was about to express her love, she breaks it off.

After buying special photography equipment, Shannon drives Tessa to the places she and Skylar had most closely connected, hoping to reconnect. Finally they do connect at The Empyrean, but not completely, and he shatters a mirror trying to reach her. The police catch up with her there, traced through her mobile.

At home, Tessa's adoptive parents are on top of her, she collapses, and in the hospital she's told her heart needs to be repaired the next day. Shannon sneaks her out, with Skylar's help (he manipulates some electronics, distracting the nurses, then guides them to the site of the accident).

In a flashback to the night of the accident, Shannon convinces Tessa to catch Skylar before he leaves. The timelines overlap. As paramedics attend Tessa's collapsed body, reunited with Skylar briefly, they are in Paris, in black and white, like the Doisneau print Le baiser. They are back at a house on the beach, and she hears from far off her adoptive mom calling her back. Tearfully, she reminds him that 'love never dies', and decides to go back to live.

Some time later, Tessa auditions for the RISD using the pictures she made during their time, telling the phenomenon of the in between.

In a mid-credits scene, Tessa and Skylar are wandering around the beach, tracing their silhouettes in the sand.

== Cast ==
- Joey King as Tessa
- Kyle Allen as Skylar
- Kim Dickens as Vickie
- John Ortiz as Mel
- Celeste O'Connor as Shannon
- Donna Biscoe as Doris
- April Parker Jones as Jasmine

== Production ==
On February 24, 2021, it was announced that Arie Posin would direct a film for Paramount+. On the same day, the film was announced together with Paranormal Activity: Next of Kin and an upcoming Pet Sematary film, with Joey King revealed as part of the cast. In April 2021, April Parker Jones, Celeste O'Connor, Donna Biscoe, Kyle Allen, John Ortiz and Kim Dickens was revealed as part of the cast of the film.

The film was shot in California and Georgia from March to May 2021, during the COVID-19 pandemic.

== Release ==
The film was released on February 11, 2022, on Paramount+. Netflix distributed the film outside the United States releasing on April 8, 2022.

== Reception ==
The film received mixed reviews from critics. The review aggregator website Rotten Tomatoes reported an approval rating of 64%, with an average score of 5.80/10, based on 11 reviews.
