= Sierra Burgess Is a Loser =

2018 film by Ian Samuels

- Release poster
- Directed by: Ian Samuels
- Written by: Lindsey Beer
- Produced by: Thad Luckinbill; Trent Luckinbill; Molly Smith; Rachel Smith
- Starring: Shannon Purser; Kristine Froseth; RJ Cyler; Noah Centineo
- Cinematography: John W. Rutland
- Edited by: Andrea Bottigliero
- Music by: Brett McLaughlin; Bram Inscore
- Production company: Black Label Media
- Distributed by: Netflix
- Release date: September 7, 2018
- Running time: 105 minutes
- Country: United States
- Language: English

Sierra Burgess Is a Loser is a 2018 American teen comedy-drama film directed by Ian Samuels from a screenplay by Lindsey Beer. The film is a modern retelling of the 1897 play Cyrano de Bergerac by Edmond Rostand, and stars Shannon Purser, Kristine Froseth, RJ Cyler, and Noah Centineo. The film was released on Netflix on September 7, 2018.

== Plot ==
Sierra Burgess is a smart, aspirational, unpopular high school student striving to get admitted into Stanford University. Popular classmate Veronica both criticizes and insults her, which she responds to with wit and sidesteps with charm.

Jamey is a handsome football player from another high school; unaware that Veronica has a boyfriend in college, he asks for her phone number. Wanting to dodge Jamey's attention, she gives him Sierra's number.

Jamey and Sierra begin texting, and eventually begin to flirt. Although she realizes he believes he is communicating with someone else, she develops a crush on him. In band class, Sierra tells her best friend Dan of the situation. He disapproves of her actions, but she defends herself by saying that Jamey's decisions to engage with her have been based on his interactions with her, not Veronica.

Veronica's college boyfriend Spence breaks up with her because he considers her unintelligent. Sierra approaches Veronica and offers to tutor her in exchange for help in continuing to talk to Jamey. Veronica agrees, and as they continue helping each other, they both learn more about and begin to appreciate one another. Veronica reveals that her father left her mother for a 22-year-old, and that her overbearing mother pushes her towards cheerleading and popularity.

Jamey eventually asks Sierra out on a date; Veronica goes with him as a favor to Sierra. When he tries to kiss her, she tells him to close his eyes, and Sierra kisses him instead.

Jamey later kisses Veronica before a football game; she becomes distraught as she feels she is betraying Sierra, much to Jamey's confusion. Sierra witnesses the kiss; in retaliation, she broadcasts to everyone that Veronica was dumped by Spence. During the game, Veronica tells Jamey the truth. When a panicked Sierra attempts to defend herself and explain, he recognizes her voice. Shocked, he tells both Sierra and Veronica to stay away from him and leaves.

Sierra writes a song called "Sunflower" and sends it to Veronica as an apology. Veronica finally confronts her mother, telling her she needs to be her own person. She then goes to Jamey's house to play him the song and convince him to give Sierra a chance. He decides to forgive Sierra and take her to homecoming, bringing her a sunflower. They share a kiss and attend homecoming together. When Veronica and Sierra see each other at the dance, they wordlessly reconcile by sharing a hug, joined by Dan.

== Cast ==
- Shannon Purser as Sierra Burgess, a bright but unpopular teenager
- Kristine Froseth as Veronica, a popular cheerleader
- RJ Cyler as Dan, Sierra's best friend
- Noah Centineo as Jamey, a high school quarterback and Sierra's accidental love interest
- Loretta Devine as Mrs. Thomson, Sierra's English teacher
- Giorgia Whigham as Chrissy, Veronica's friend and fellow cheerleader
- Alice Lee as Mackenzie, Veronica's friend and fellow cheerleader
- Lea Thompson as Jules Osborn-Burgess, Sierra's mother
- Alan Ruck as Stephen Burgess, Sierra's father
- Mary Pat Gleason as Counselor Stevens, Sierra's high school guidance counselor
- Chrissy Metz as Trish, Veronica's overbearing and estranged mother
- Elizabeth Tovey as Brody, Veronica's little twin sister
- Mariam Tovey as Scooter, Veronica's little twin sister
- Matt Malloy as Biology Teacher
- Will Peltz as Spence
- Geoff Stults as Coach Johnson
- Wolfgang Novogratz as Drew

== Production ==
The film was first announced in September 2016 as a modern retelling of Cyrano de Bergerac, to be directed by Ian Samuels from a screenplay by Lindsey Beer (Chaos Walking). Ben Hardy had been set to play the male lead role. In the same announcement, it was revealed Molly Smith and Thad Luckinbill's Black Label Media (Sicario, La La Land) would produce the film, with Beer executive producing. On January 18, 2018, it was announced that Netflix had acquired the rights to the film.

In December 2016, RJ Cyler was cast as the title character's best friend. On January 5, 2017, Shannon Purser was set to star as Sierra Burgess, and the following day, Kristine Froseth was cast in a supporting role. Later that same month, Will Peltz was also added. On February 1, 2017, Noah Centineo was set for the male lead, taking over from Ben Hardy. Also in February 2017, Lea Thompson and Alan Ruck were cast as the title character's parents.

In July 2017, songwriter and musician Leland announced that he had completed scoring the film, with Bram Inscore. In addition, he stated that the pair had also co-written a song with Troye Sivan and Allie X that would be featured in the film. The group co-wrote a song with the film's screenwriter, Lindsey Beer, entitled "Sunflower", an original song written in the script and performed by Shannon Purser.

== Release ==
The film was released on Netflix on September 7, 2018.

== Reception ==
On the review aggregator website Rotten Tomatoes, the film holds an approval rating of 61% based on 38 reviews, with an average rating of 5.7/10. The website's critics consensus reads, "Sierra Burgess Is a Loser, but her movie's okay – largely thanks to Shannon Purser's work in the title role, which is strong enough to counter an uneven narrative." On Metacritic, which assigns a weighted average score out of 100 to reviews from mainstream critics, the film received an average score of 60, based on reviews from 14 critics, indicating "mixed or average" reviews.

Proma Khosla from Mashable criticized the film for romanticizing certain character choices by the female protagonist, Sierra Burgess, specifically her catfishing and sharing a non-consensual kiss with her love interest, hacking, cyber bullying and mistreating her friend, and pretending to be deaf with support from one of her friends. Hannah Giorgis from The Atlantic similarly criticized the film, stating it "disappointingly fails to indict the protagonist’s deceptive behavior".

== See also ==
- List of films featuring the deaf and hard of hearing
