= Ian Samuels =

American film director

Ian Samuels is an American filmmaker. He directed the film The Map of Tiny Perfect Things (2021).

== Biography ==
Samuels grew up in Massachusetts. He studied film and literature at Bard College before moving to New York to work at Sesame Street. Samuels then moved to CalArts to study directing. In 2015, MTV commissioned Samuels to create the short Myrna the Monster, about a three foot tall puppet struggling to make connections in Los Angeles. The film screened at South by Southwest.

== Filmography ==
- Caterwaul (short; 2012)
- Myrna the Monster (2015)
- Sierra Burgess Is a Loser (2018)
- The Map of Tiny Perfect Things (2021)
