= Lori Nelson Spielman =

American author (born 1961)

- Born: April 30, 1961 (age 65); Lansing, Michigan, U.S.
- Education: Central Michigan University (BA); Michigan State University (MA)
- Occupation: Author
- Writing career
- Language: English

Lori Nelson Spielman (born April 30, 1961, in Lansing, Michigan) is an American author, mostly known for her Best Seller The Life List, published by Bantam Books/Random House in July 2013 and translated into 27 languages in 30 countries. As of December 2018 two more of her books were published – Sweet Forgiveness (Plume, 2015) and Quote Me (Temporary name, 2018).

== Biography ==
Spielman was born in 1961, in Lansing, Michigan, the fourth child of a Catholic working-class couple – Franc and Joan Nelson – and the first of them to attend university. After graduating (BA, Central Michigan University; MA, Michigan State University), she became a speech pathologist and then a homebound teacher, teaching mentally or physically ill students in their homes or at the hospital. Her first book heroine's profession is exactly that – homebound teacher.

Spielman started writing only after reaching 48 years of age. It was in October 2009 that she started the first draft for her first book The Life List; four years later it was published. In the midst of the book promotion, she was diagnosed with breast cancer. After two surgeries, she was told that she is cancer-free. As of 2015, having written and published her second novel, Sweet Forgiveness, she has retired from teaching and became a full-time writer.

Nelson Spielman lives in East Lansing with her husband Bill Spielman. She has no children.
