= Teacher in Space Project =

NASA program from 1984 to 1990

- Logo of the Teacher in Space Project
- Duration: 1984–1990
- Goals: Spur student interest in mathematics, science, and space exploration
- Result: Launched Christa McAuliffe on STS-51-L; killed during launch in the Space Shuttle Challenger disaster
- Organizer: NASA
- Casualties: 1
- Related programs: Educator Astronaut Project; Journalist in Space Project (cancelled); Teachers in Space, Inc.

The Teacher in Space Project (TISP) was a NASA program announced by U.S. President Ronald Reagan in 1984 designed to inspire students, honor teachers, and spur interest in mathematics, science, and space exploration. The project would carry teachers into space as payload specialists (non-astronaut civilians), who would return to their classrooms to share the experience with their students.

NASA cancelled the program in 1990, following the death of its first participant, Christa McAuliffe, in the Space Shuttle Challenger disaster (STS-51-L) on January 28, 1986. NASA replaced Teachers in Space in 1998 with the Educator Astronaut Project, which required its participants to become astronaut Mission Specialists. The first Educator Astronauts were selected as part of NASA Astronaut Group 19 in 2004.

Barbara Morgan, who was selected as a mission specialist as part of NASA Astronaut Group 17 in 1998, has often been incorrectly referred to as an Educator Astronaut. However, she was selected as a mission specialist before the Educator Astronaut Project.

== NASA programs ==
Announcement by George Bush of the First Teacher in Space, July 19, 1985.

TISP was announced by President Ronald Reagan on August 27, 1984, during a speech on education policy in Washington, D.C. Rather than being inducted as members of NASA's Astronaut Corps, the teachers would fly as Payload Specialists and return to their classrooms after flight. This was the first time that NASA would send any "citizen passengers" into space, which had been a goal of the Space Shuttle program from the beginning. The program was part of the Reagan administration's response to the education reform movement and to the 1983 A Nation at Risk report which found that public education in the United States was inadequate. While many teachers expressed excitement about the announcement, the National Education Association, the largest teachers' union in the U.S., criticized the program as a gimmick. NEA president Mary Hatwood Futrell said, "We don't need to send a teacher into space. We need to send teachers into well-equipped classrooms."

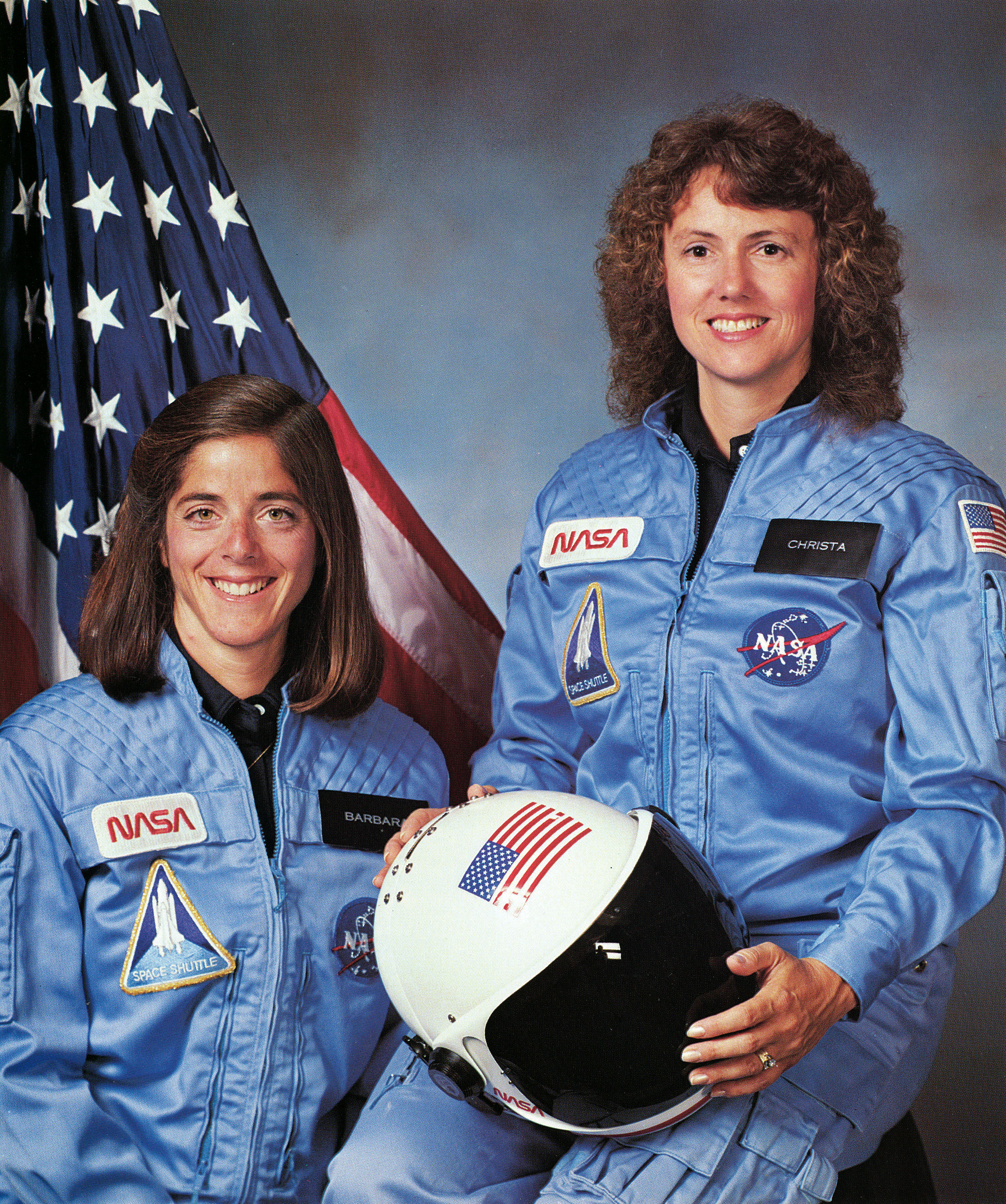
Barbara Morgan and Christa McAuliffe, backup and primary TISP participants for Mission STS-51-L

More than 40,000 applications were mailed to interested teachers while 11,000 teachers sent completed applications to NASA, including an essay on why they wanted to go to space and a proposal for a lesson that they would teach while on the Space Shuttle. Each of the applications was sent to the public Department of Education of that teacher's state. The state education agencies of each of the 50 states, the District of Columbia, Guam, Puerto Rico, and the U.S. Virgin Islands, as well as three federal agencies – the Department of Defense Dependents Schools, the State Department Office of Overseas Schools, and the Office of Indian Education Programs – were each responsible for selecting two nominees for national consideration before a deadline of May 1, 1985. These 114 nominees were invited to a summit in Washington, D.C., from June 22–27, 1985, where they were further evaluated by a panel of 20 judges, which included university president Richard Berendzen, actress Pam Dawber, athlete Wes Unseld, and artificial heart inventor Dr. Robert Jarvik. William Pierce, president of the Council of Chief State School Officers, who headed the panel, said that the teachers were evaluated based on their essays, their medical fitness, and whether the judges would "like to see this person on the cover of Time and on the Today Show". NASA administrator James M. Beggs announced the selection of 10 finalists on July 1, 1985.

McAuliffe's NASA interview film during training for STS-51-L.

The finalists were brought to the Johnson Space Center in Houston and Space Camp in Huntsville, Alabama, for further medical examination and preliminary astronaut training. While the teachers were riding Space Camp's "Lunar Odyssey" simulator ride, Space Camp employee Gregory Walker fell into the ride's machinery and was killed, emotionally affecting the candidates who had witnessed the accident. After the two-week session, the judging panel unanimously selected S. Christa McAuliffe, a high school social studies teacher from Concord, New Hampshire, as the first teacher astronaut. She planned to teach two 15-minute lessons from the Space Shuttle, which would have been nationally televised. Barbara Morgan, an elementary school teacher from McCall, Idaho, was selected as her backup. The other eight finalists continued to work for NASA for one year instead of returning to their classrooms.

McAuliffe died in the Space Shuttle Challenger disaster on January 28, 1986, along with the other six crew members of STS-51-L. After the accident, Reagan spoke on national television and assured the nation that the Teacher in Space program would continue. "We'll continue our quest in space", he said. "There will be more shuttle flights and more shuttle crews and, yes, more volunteers, more civilians, more teachers in space. Nothing ends here; our hopes and our journeys continue." However, NASA decided in 1990 that spaceflight was still too dangerous to risk the lives of civilian teachers, and eliminated the Teacher in Space project. Morgan returned to teaching in Idaho and later became a mission specialist on STS-118.

=== Educator Astronaut Project ===
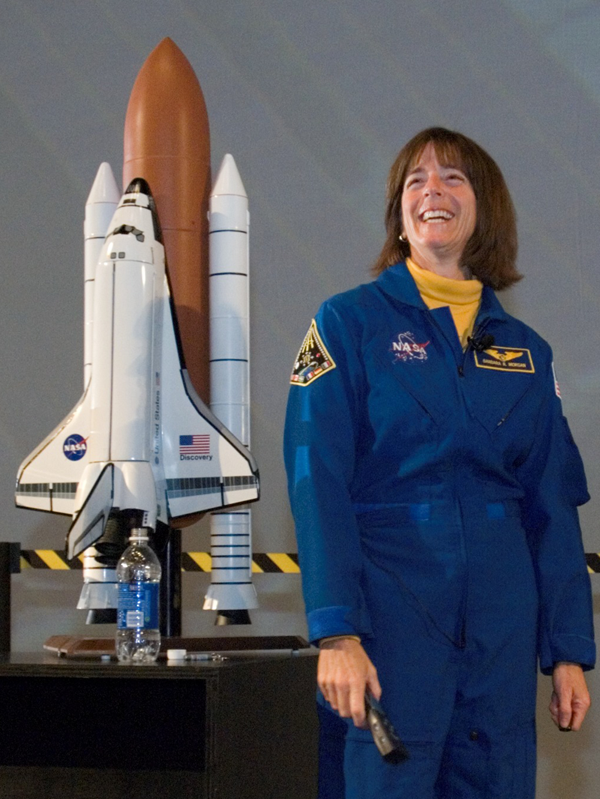
Barbara Morgan, Mission Specialist and backup for the Teacher in Space Project, speaks to an audience of students and media during a January 2007 demonstration at Space Center Houston.

In January 1998, NASA replaced the Teacher In Space project with the Educator Astronaut Project. Instead of training teachers for five months as Payload Specialists who would return to the classroom, the Educator Astronaut program required selectees to give up their teaching careers, move to Houston, and become Mission Specialists (full-time NASA astronauts).

The first three Educator Astronauts were selected in October 2004: Joseph Acaba, Richard Arnold and Dorothy Metcalf-Lindenburger. Acaba and Arnold flew aboard STS-119 in March 2009, and Metcalf-Lindenburger on STS-131 in April 2010.

Although many sources including some NASA ones incorrectly refer to Barbara Morgan (who flew on STS-118 in August 2007) as the first Educator Astronaut, she was actually selected as a standard mission specialist in 1998, before the Educator Astronaut Project was in place.

== Teacher in Space Education Foundation ==
The Teacher in Space Education Foundation was established by the 114 teacher nominees on January 26, 1986, with the goal of supporting public education, particularly in space-science-related topics. McAuliffe was named the foundation's honorary president, Morgan its vice president, and the other eight finalists its board of directors. After the disaster, the foundation merged with a similar organization founded by the families of the seven astronauts to create the Challenger Center for Space Science Education, which operates dozens of Challenger Learning Centers across America and supports educational programs.

== Private program ==
In the early 21st century, the Teacher in Space project was revived in the private sector. The development of reusable, suborbital launch vehicles by commercial companies makes it possible for nonprofit groups to contemplate sending large numbers of teachers into space. The new Teachers in Space program began in 2005. In March 2005, Teacher in Space candidate Pam Leestma, a second-grade teacher and cousin of Space Shuttle astronaut David Leestma, completed a training flight aboard a MiG-21 operated by X-Rocket, LLC.

Armadillo Aerospace, Masten Space Systems, PlanetSpace, Rocketplane Limited, Inc., and XCOR Aerospace pledged flights to the new Teachers in Space project. Advisors to the new Teachers in Space project include SpaceShipOne builder and Ansari X-Prize winner Burt Rutan, X-Prize founder Peter Diamandis, Apollo astronaut Buzz Aldrin, and private astronaut and X-Prize sponsor Anousheh Ansari.

The United States Rocket Academy partnered with the SFF in 2006, and worked to draft rules for a "pathfinder" competition to select the first Teachers in Space. The rules were announced at the Wirefly X PRIZE Cup Competition held at Holloman Air Force Base near Alamogordo, New Mexico in October 2007. Applications were accepted until November 4, 2008. On July 20, 2009, Teachers in Space announced its first group of "Pathfinders": astronaut teacher candidates.

On June 11, 2013, Embry–Riddle Aeronautical University's new Commercial Space Operations degree program, the first of its kind in the world, announced they will sponsor the Teachers in Space summer workshops for the next five years, indicating their intent toward a continuing long term relationship as well as their sharing a vision to "...help students, teachers and organizers collaborate in bringing space education to every level, from K-12 to graduate programs."

In 2014, Program director Elizabeth Kennick incorporated the Teachers in Space project as an educational nonprofit in New York, spinning it off from the Space Frontier Foundation. Five original Pathfinders (James Kuhl, Rachael Manzer, Lanette Oliver, Chantelle Rose, and Michael Schmidt) remain with the program, also Vice President Joe Latrell and several teacher volunteers. Teachers in Space, Inc. has now flown two teacher/student designed experiments to International Space Station (ISS), launched and retrieved several high altitude balloons with data sensors, put teachers through astronaut training experiences including hypobaric chamber and centrifuge, and delivered weeklong professional development workshops for Science, Technology, Engineering and Math (STEM) teachers in California, Florida, Oklahoma, Texas, and Georgia.

== See also ==
- Educator Astronaut Project
- STS-118
