= Educator Astronaut Project =

NASA program focused on student STEM excitement

The Educator Astronaut Project is a NASA program to educate students and spur interest in science, technology, engineering, math, and space exploration. It is a successor to the Teacher in Space Project of the 1980s, which NASA cancelled after the death of teacher-astronaut Christa McAuliffe in the Space Shuttle Challenger disaster (STS-51-L) amid concerns about the risk of sending civilians into space.

== History ==
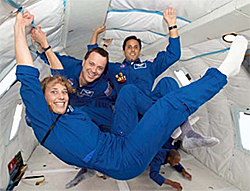
Educator Astronauts Dorothy Metcalf-Lindenberger, Richard Arnold, and Joseph Acaba during a microgravity flight

In the 1990s, NASA created the Educator Astronaut Project, which carries on the objectives of the Teacher in Space Program—seeking to elevate teaching as a profession and inspire students. Unlike the Teacher in Space Program, educator astronauts are fully trained astronauts who do the same jobs and duties that any other astronaut does. They fly as crew members with critical mission responsibilities, as well as education-related goals. In addition to their technical assignments, they assist other astronauts in connecting to students and teachers through space exploration.

Joseph M. Acaba, Richard R. Arnold and Dorothy Metcalf-Lindenburger were selected as the first educator mission specialists in the 2004 class. Both Acaba and Arnold were part of the crew of STS-119, a Space Shuttle mission to the International Space Station (ISS) which was flown by Space Shuttle Discovery in March 2009. Metcalf-Lindenburger flew on STS-131 in April 2010, also visiting the ISS aboard Space Shuttle Discovery.

== Barbara Morgan ==
Barbara Morgan, the backup to Christa McAuliffe in the Teacher in Space Project, remained involved with NASA after the Challenger disaster and continued to work with NASA's Education Division until her selection as a mission specialist in 1998. Morgan completed two years of astronaut training and evaluation, and began official duties in 2000. Morgan became the first former teacher to travel to space on STS-118. While NASA press releases and media briefings often referred to her as a "mission specialist educator" or "educator astronaut", Morgan did not train in the Educator Astronaut Project. NASA Administrator Michael D. Griffin clarified at a press conference after STS-118 that Morgan was not considered a mission specialist educator, but rather was a standard mission specialist, who had once been a teacher. Morgan's duties as a mission specialist were no different from other Shuttle mission specialists.
