= Kyle Allen (actor) =

American actor (born 1994)

- Born: Kyle Hamilton Allen; October 10, 1994 (age 31); Livermore, California, U.S.
- Occupation: Actor
- Years active: 2014–present

Kyle Hamilton Allen (born October 10, 1994) is an American actor known for his roles in The Path (2016–2018), American Horror Story: Apocalypse (2018), West Side Story (2021), The Map of Tiny Perfect Things (2021), The In Between (2022), and The Life List (2025).

== Early life ==
A native of Livermore, California, Allen began training in acrobatics at a young age, and attended the Kirov Academy of Ballet in Washington D.C., where upon watching Taras Domitro perform Romeo & Juliet at the Kennedy Center, felt discouraged from pursuing ballet further. Upon graduation, he lived in Los Angeles picking up commercial work as well as a part lip syncing in a Master P music video.

== Career ==
In July 2015, Allen was cast in a lead role on the Hulu drama series The Path co-starring Aaron Paul and Michelle Monaghan, appearing in all 36 episodes. Upon the series ending in 2018, Allen appeared in a recurring role in American Horror Story, and in 2019, he was cast as Balkan, one of the Jets in Steven Spielberg's West Side Story, an adaptation of the Broadway musical of the same name.

In 2021, Allen was cast as Romeo in Rosaline, a modern retelling of Romeo & Juliet co-starring Kaitlyn Dever and Isabela Merced, and in The Greatest Beer Run Ever co-starring Zac Efron and Russell Crowe. On January 28, 2022, Allen was cast as He-Man in the Netflix live-action film reboot of Masters of the Universe, before it was canceled. In October 2022, Allen was announced to star in A Haunting in Venice, the third instalment of Kenneth Branagh's Hercule Poirot adaptations.

In 2025, he featured Kathryn Bigelow's Netflix film A House of Dynamite. The same year, he has starred alongside Sofia Carson in Netflix's newest romantic comedy, The Life List.

== Filmography ==
=== Film ===
Year	Title	Role	Notes	Ref.
2016	One Night	Andrew 'Andy' McFarland		
2017	XX	Andy	Segment: Her Only Living Son	
2020	All My Life	Kyle Campbell		
2021	The Map of Tiny Perfect Things	Mark		
2021	West Side Story	Balkan		
2022	The In Between	Skylar Adams		
2022	Space Oddity	Alex McAllister		
2022	Rosaline	Romeo		
2022	The Greatest Beer Run Ever	Bobby Pappas		
2023	A Haunting in Venice	Maxime Gerard		
2025	The Life List	Brad Ackerman		
2025	A House of Dynamite	Captain John Zimmer		
TBA	Untitled Mike Thornton biopic film †	TBA	Filming	

Key
†	Denotes works that have not yet been released

=== Television ===
Year	Title	Role	Notes	Ref.
2016–2018	The Path	Hawk Lane	Main role, 36 episodes	
2017–2018	Strangers	Milo	Recurring role	
2018	American Horror Story: Apocalypse	Timothy Campbell	4 episodes	
