= Mission specialist =

Status held by certain NASA astronauts on space shuttle missions

Mission specialist (MS) is a specific position held by astronauts who are tasked with conducting a range of scientific, medical, or engineering experiments during a spaceflight mission. These specialists are usually assigned to a specific field of expertise that is related to the goals of the particular mission they are assigned to.

Mission specialists are highly trained individuals who undergo extensive training in preparation for their missions. They are required to have a broad range of skills, including knowledge of science and engineering, as well as experience in operating complex equipment in a zero-gravity environment.

During a mission, mission specialists are responsible for conducting experiments, operating equipment, and performing spacewalks to repair or maintain equipment outside the spacecraft. They also play a critical role in ensuring the safety of the crew by monitoring the spacecraft's systems and responding to emergencies as needed.

The role of mission specialist was an important one in the Space Shuttle program, as they were instrumental in the success of the program's many scientific and engineering missions. Many of the advances in science and technology that were made during this period were made possible by the hard work and dedication of the mission specialists who worked tirelessly to push the boundaries of what was possible in space.
