= Manned Spaceflight Engineer Program =

US air force program

The Manned Spaceflight Engineer Program was an effort by the United States Air Force to train American military personnel as payload specialists for United States Department of Defense missions on the Space Shuttle program.

== Background ==
The United States Air Force (USAF) and the National Reconnaissance Office (NRO) of the United States Department of Defense (DoD) participated in the development of the Space Shuttle from its official inception in 1969. To save money, the shuttle was intended to serve as the United States' national launch system for all civilian, military, and IC payloads. The DoD influenced key aspects of the shuttle's design such as the size of its cargo bay, and Congress reportedly told DoD that it would not pay for satellites not designed to fit into the bay.

The USAF in the 1970s hoped to buy up to three shuttles and fly them with all-military crews. As with the earlier X-20 Dyna-Soar and Manned Orbiting Laboratory, budget concerns ended the "Blue Shuttle" program, but the USAF gained the use of up to one third of all launches and the right to requisition the next available launch for high-priority payloads. It renovated SLC-6 at Vandenberg Air Force Base in California to send shuttles into polar orbits and established the Manned Spaceflight Control Squadron at the Johnson Space Center in Houston. Squadron personnel participated in monitoring shuttle flights from NASA's Mission Control Center, where the military built a secure facility to support classified Shuttle missions. The squadron was to move to the planned DoD mission control center in Colorado that would monitor an expected 12 to 14 flights each year.

== MSE ==
Many active-duty USAF and other American military personnel have served (about 60% of the total in 1985), and continue to serve, as NASA astronauts. Although with the end of "Blue Shuttle" DoD no longer needed its own shuttle pilots and mission specialists, it still desired military payload specialists for classified payloads on the about 100 or more shuttle flights it expected to use. While NASA offered to train the DoD astronauts the military wanted to control their training, as DoD astronauts who went to NASA rarely returned.

In 1979, the first 13 Manned Spaceflight Engineers (MSEs) were selected, chosen from all services and based at Los Angeles Air Force Base:

- Frank J. Casserino
- Jeffrey E. DeTroye
- Michael A. Hamel
- Terry A. Higbee
- Daryl J. Joseph
- Malcolm W. Lydon
- Gary E. Payton (flew on STS-51-C, 1985)
- Jerry J. Rij
- Paul A. Sefchek
- Eric E. Sundberg
- David M. Vidrine, USN (removed from STS-41-C one month before launch)
- John Brett Watterson (assigned to STS-62-A, canceled after Challenger accident)
- Keith C. Wright (backup for STS-51-C)

In 1982, another 14 were selected, chosen only from the USAF:

- James B. Armor, Jr.
- Michael W. Booen (backup for Pailes)
- Livingston L. Holder, Jr.
- Larry D. James
- Charles E. Jones
- Maureen C. LaComb
- Michael R. Mantz (backup for STS-62-A)
- Randy T. Odle (assigned to STS-62-A)
- William A. Pailes (flew on STS-51-J, 1985)
- Craig A. Puz
- Katherine E. Sparks Roberts
- Jess M. Sponable
- William D. Thompson
- Glenn S. Yeakel

In 1985, five more were selected:

- Joseph J. Caretto
- Robert B. Crombie
- Frank M. DeArmond
- David P. Staib, Jr.
- Theresa M. Stevens

The 32 MSEs were told that each would fly in space at least once. Five became generals. In 1991, Chief Warrant Officer Thomas J. Hennen, United States Army flew aboard STS-44 as the first military payload specialist since Payton and Pailes, and the first enlisted soldier in space. He was not an MSE, but he and backup Michael E. Belt were assigned to the US Army Intelligence Center at Ft. Huachuca, Arizona.

== Secrecy ==
As a civilian agency, NASA typically freely provides details on all aspects of its operations. The DoD shuttle missions required different procedures to maintain the secrecy of the classified payloads. The government viewed the flights and their payloads as secret as troop movements, asked media organizations to avoid reporting details, and threatened to investigate even speculation as potential leaks of classified information. The military did not disclose MSEs' names at first, unlike those chosen for Dyna-Soar and MOL, and the program's existence was secret until the press reported on it in 1982. The Air Force officially announced the MSE group's existence in 1983 but did not identify any members until 1985, and disclosed little about their role on flights. The press nonetheless reported in great detail on likely military payloads using open source intelligence, such as the direction of the shuttle after liftoff.

Unlike all other flights, NASA only began public countdowns a few minutes before launch, did not distribute press kits, and did not permit reporters to attend countdowns or listen to shuttle-to-ground communications. A secure USAF-NRO mission control center in Sunnyvale, California monitored the DoD payloads on flights alongside the Houston mission control and Firing Room 4 at Launch Control Center. NASA announced civilian shuttle missions' schedules and flight routes in advance, hundreds of civilians attended most landings, and loudspeakers played radio transmissions. Only a few reporters and NASA employees, by contrast, attended the classified flights' silent landings.

== Difficulties ==
The MSE program faced internal and external challenges. NASA astronaut and Navy rear admiral Thomas K. Mattingly recalled that the agency early on had a "sour" relationship with the MSEs. NASA was reluctant to assign them to its flights given their lack of NASA training and the need for spots for other payload specialists. Payton said in 2016, "NASA thought of us as a bunch of snotty-nosed kids, outsiders, almost guests"; Hamel said that there was "a titanic clash of cultures (between NASA and the Air Force), and the MSEs were at the eye of the storm".

Internal USAF debates on the usefulness of crewed spaceflight to the DoD caused uncertainty for MSE personnel. When Lew Allen—Chief of Staff of the United States Air Force—met DeTroye in 1981, the general told the MSE that he did not believe that human spaceflight was useful, had helped cancel MOL, and would have canceled the shuttle. USAF General Ralph G. Jacobson removed MSE David Vidrine from STS-41-C one month before launch, stating that the mission had no value to the Air Force. The military declined the opportunity to send a second MSE on STS-51-C. New regulations in 1984 strongly encouraged USAF personnel to move to another assignment after four years, causing many early MSEs to transfer out of the program, with only nine active by late 1985.

== End ==
DoD and Air Force had hoped to use 10 to 12 shuttle flights a year, but NASA could not fly the shuttle that often. By December 1984 DoD stated that it planned to use about 20% of the 70 shuttle flights NASA planned over the following five years, with almost all military-related launches moving to the shuttle from uncrewed rockets.

Ongoing launch delays caused DoD to express concern about over-dependence on the shuttle. In 1983 Under Secretary of the Air Force and NRO director Pete Aldridge proposed that DoD continue purchasing uncrewed rockets until the shuttle proved its reliability by flying 24 missions a year. In February 1984 President Ronald Reagan signed a National Security Decision Directive stating that the shuttle would not be "fully operational" until 24 missions a year, perhaps by 1988. Despite Congressional and NASA opposition, in 1984 DoD began procuring a new uncrewed rocket capable of launching shuttle-sized payloads into geosynchronous orbit. In 1985 it won approval to buy ten such rockets, which became the Titan IV; NASA flew nine shuttle flights that year.

To improve DoD-NASA relations the space agency agreed to fly Aldridge on STS-62-A, scheduled for 1986 as the first Vandenberg shuttle mission. While training for the mission he watched on television the loss of Challenger in January 1986; the accident accelerated DoD plans for uncrewed rockets, but several NRO payloads only the shuttle could launch were grounded until it flew again, a dilemma NRO had feared as early as the mid-1970s.

With DoD's return to uncrewed rockets and less need for dedicated military astronauts, the MSE program ended in 1988 with only two MSEs having flown into space. The Houston squadron was dissolved, construction of the Colorado center ended, the Vandenberg launch site used for uncrewed rockets, and Firing Room 4 closed. Only active duty-military NASA astronauts flew on subsequent missions with DoD payloads, except Story Musgrave and Kathryn C. Thornton on STS-33.

== Shuttle missions with classified payloads ==
In 1993 a "high-ranking intelligence official" awarded all crewmembers of the classified shuttle flights with the National Intelligence Medal of Achievement. The astronauts were permitted to wear the medals in public and discuss details of their flights that appeared on the medals' citations.

- STS-4, 1982 (non-DoD flight with classified DoD payload)
- STS-51-C, 1985 (first all-DoD flight; beginning of secrecy)
- STS-51-J, 1985
- STS-27, 1988
- STS-28, 1989
- STS-33, 1989
- STS-36, 1990
- STS-38, 1990
- STS-39, 1991 (first unclassified DoD flight; only one payload was classified)
- STS-44, 1991 (the payload was declassified before launch)
- STS-53, 1992
