= Ken Mattingly =

American astronaut (1936–2023)

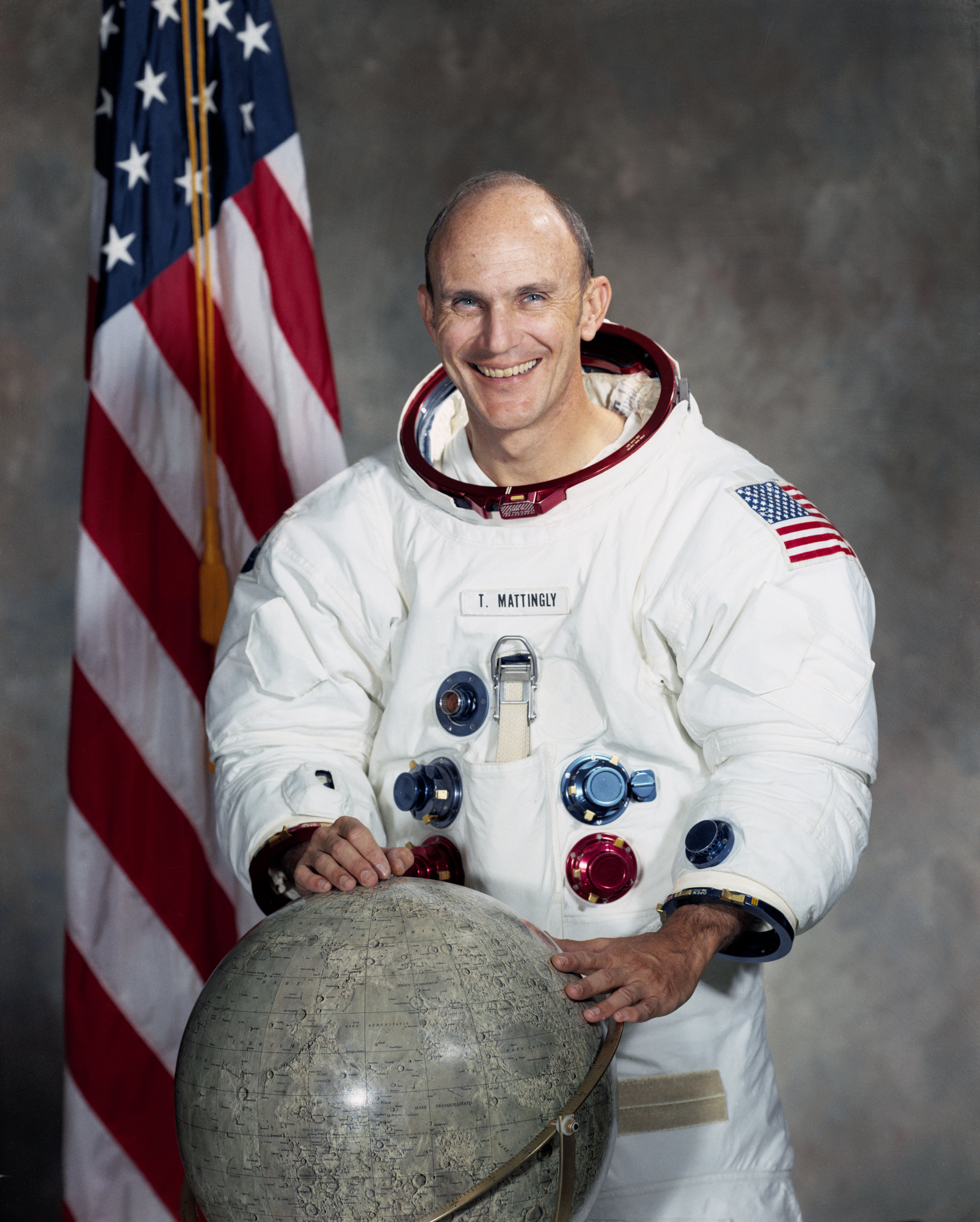
- Mattingly in 1971
- Born: Thomas Kenneth Mattingly II; March 17, 1936; Chicago, Illinois, U.S.
- Died: October 31, 2023 (aged 87); Arlington, Virginia, U.S.
- Education: Auburn University (BS)
- Spouse: Elizabeth Dailey (m. 1970)
- Children: 1
- Awards: NASA Distinguished Service Medal
- Space career

NASA astronaut
- Rank: Rear Admiral, USN
- Time in space: 21d 4h 34m
- Selection: NASA Group 5 (1966)
- Total EVAs: 1
- Total EVA time: 1h 23m
- Missions: Apollo 16; STS-4; STS-51-C
- Retired: June 1985

Signature
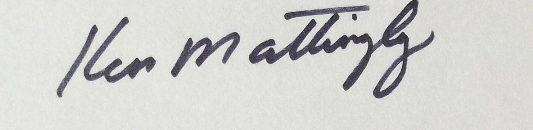

Thomas Kenneth Mattingly II (March 17, 1936 – October 31, 2023) was an American aviator, aeronautical engineer, test pilot, rear admiral in the United States Navy, and astronaut who orbited the Moon on Apollo 16 and flew on the STS-4 and STS-51-C missions.

Born in Chicago, Illinois, Mattingly was replaced as Apollo 13 command module pilot (CMP) three days before launch, then helped NASA bring the crippled spacecraft home. Mattingly flew as CMP for Apollo 16 and made 64 lunar orbits, becoming one of the 24 Apollo astronauts to reach the Moon. During Apollo 16's return to Earth, Mattingly performed an extravehicular activity to retrieve film cassettes from the command and service module. It was the second "deep space" EVA in history, at great distance from any planetary body.

Mattingly and his Apollo 16 commander, John Young, are the only astronauts to have flown to the Moon and also orbited the Earth on the Space Shuttle.

== Early life and education ==
Thomas Kenneth Mattingly II was born on March 17, 1936, in Chicago, Illinois, to Thomas Kenneth Mattingly and Constance Mason Mattingly (née Clarke). His father, who had been hired by Eastern Airlines soon after his son's birth, moved the family to Hialeah, Florida. Aviation became part of Mattingly's life from a very young age; he later recalled that his "earliest memories...all had to do with airplanes".

Mattingly was active in the Boy Scouts of America where he achieved its second highest rank, Life Scout. He graduated from Miami Edison High School in 1954, and went on to receive a Bachelor of Science degree in aeronautical engineering from Auburn University in 1958. He was also a member of Delta Tau Delta fraternity (Epsilon Alpha chapter).

== Military career ==
Mattingly was commissioned in the U.S. Navy as an ensign in 1958 and received his aviator wings in 1960. He was then assigned to Attack Squadron Thirty-five (VA-35) at Naval Air Station Oceana, Virginia, and flew Douglas A-1H Skyraider propeller aircraft aboard the aircraft carrier USS Saratoga from 1960 to 1963. In July 1963, he was transferred to Heavy Attack Squadron Eleven (VAH-11) at Naval Air Station Sanford, Florida, where he flew Douglas A-3B Skywarrior jet aircraft for two years and deployed aboard USS Franklin D. Roosevelt.

While Mattingly was based at Sanford, a fellow officer invited him along on a mission to take aerial photos of the Cape Canaveral launch of Gemini 3 (carrying Mattingly's future Apollo 16 Commander John W. Young) from the air.

During his second cruise, Mattingly attempted to join the United States Naval Test Pilot School at Naval Air Station Patuxent River, but the cruise ended after the class started. He was selected to attend the U.S. Air Force Aerospace Research Pilot School at Edwards Air Force Base in California, where future astronauts Edgar Mitchell and Karol J. Bobko were his classmates and his instructors included Charles Duke, his Apollo 16 crewmate, and Henry W. Hartsfield Jr., whom Mattingly later commanded on STS-4.

== NASA career ==
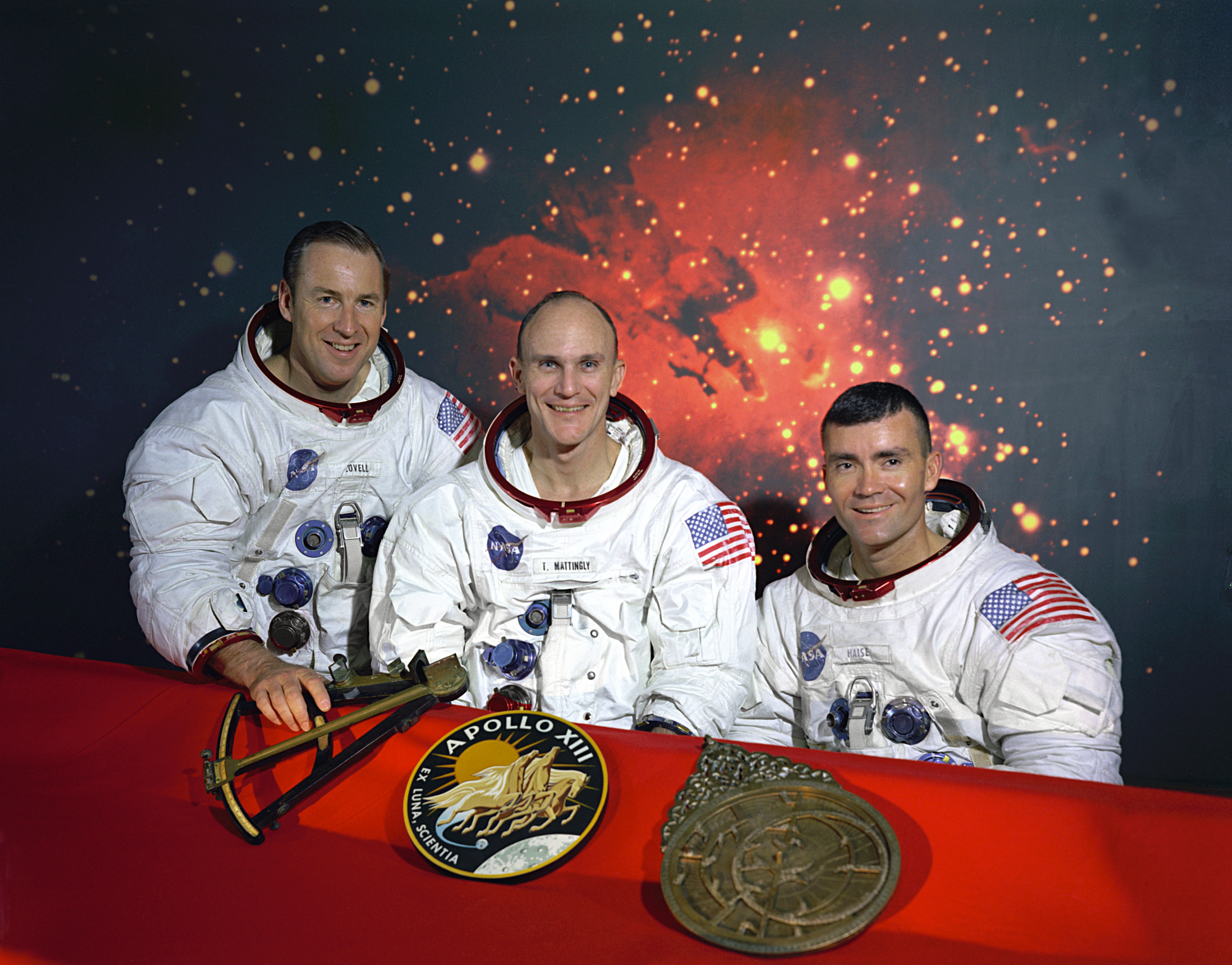
Mattingly (center) as part of the original prime crew for Apollo 13

=== Selection and training ===
On September 10, 1965, NASA began the selection process for the fifth astronaut group. From a pool of 351 applicants, NASA picked 159 candidates who met the basic qualifications, including being United States citizens born on or after December 1, 1929, who were no more than six feet tall. They were also required to have at least 1,000 hours of flight time in jet aircraft. Mattingly had previously shown little interest and inclination to apply for the astronaut program, but his views changed at the Air Force Test Pilot School where he and his classmates were offered the chance to apply for either NASA or the United States Air Force (USAF) Manned Orbiting Laboratory program. Mattingly and Mitchell chose the latter and were rejected. The deadline for applying for the NASA group had passed, but one of their instructors was able to get NASA to accept their applications. On the interview panel the astronaut office representatives were John W. Young and Michael Collins, who were at that time in training as prime crew for Gemini 10. Mattingly later recollected that he was "perplexed" by Young. Collins asked Mattingly how he felt about the Lockheed F-104 Starfighter, to which Mattingly replied that he thought it was a "fun aircraft" but without worth in combat. Collins appeared to dislike the answer and Mattingly felt he had blown his chance. After the conclusion of the selection process, however, Mattingly was called by NASA's Director of Flight Crew Operations Deke Slayton with an offer to become an astronaut.

At the time of his selection, Mattingly had 2,582 hours of flight experience, including 1,036 hours in jet aircraft. He also had a bachelor's degree in engineering or in the physical or biological sciences as required by the initial qualifications. From the 100 military personnel and 59 civilian candidates, NASA selected 19 to join the group for training as astronauts.

Mattingly, a lieutenant in the Navy, was a student at the U.S. Air Force Aerospace Research Pilot School at Edwards AFB, California, when NASA selected him as an astronaut in April 1966.

=== Apollo 8 and Apollo 11 ===
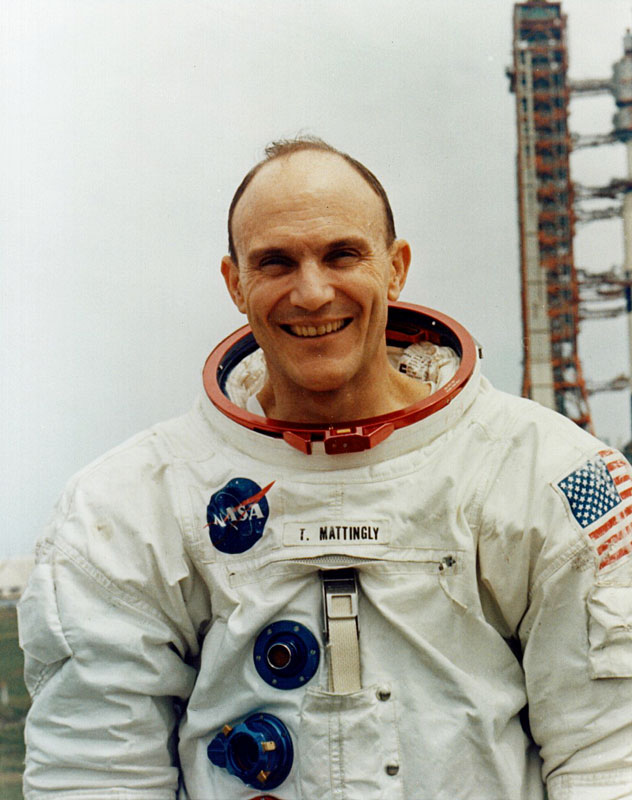
Mattingly poses at the launch pad.

At first, Mattingly was part of the support crew for Apollo 8. Mattingly served as CAPCOM during Apollo 8's second television transmission and subsequent preparation for trans-Earth injection.

Mattingly then trained in parallel with Bill Anders for Apollo 11 as backup command module pilot, because Anders was going to retire from NASA in August 1969 and, in case of mission delay, would be unavailable.

=== Apollo 13 ===
Mattingly was to be the Command Module Pilot on the Apollo 13 mission. Originally, Jim Lovell, Mattingly and Fred Haise were scheduled to fly on Apollo 14 but his crew was switched to Apollo 13 so that the commander of the other crew, Alan Shepard, who was grounded during Project Gemini could train longer. Three days prior to launch, he was removed from the mission because he had been exposed to German measles (which he never contracted) and was replaced by the backup CM pilot, Jack Swigert. As a result, he missed the dramatic in-flight explosion that crippled the spacecraft. On the ground, Mattingly played a large role in helping the crew solve the problem of power conservation during re-entry.

=== Apollo 16 ===
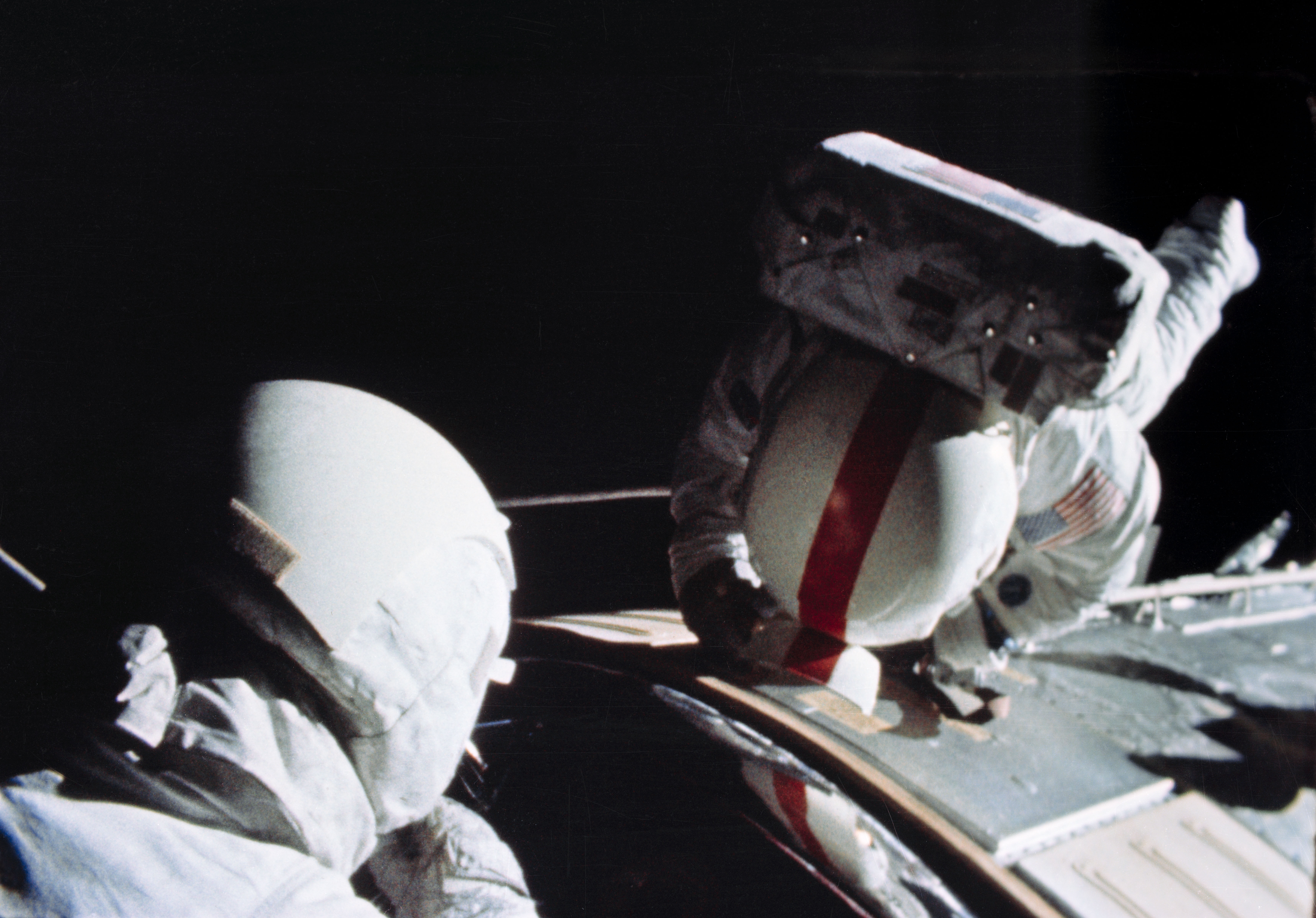
Mattingly performs a deep-space EVA during Apollo 16

The swapout from Apollo 13 placed Mattingly on the crew that flew Apollo 16 (April 16–27, 1972), the fifth crewed lunar landing mission. The crew included John Young (Commander), Mattingly (Command Module Pilot), and Charlie Duke (Lunar Module Pilot). The mission assigned to Apollo 16 was to collect samples from the lunar highlands near the crater Descartes. While in lunar orbit the scientific instruments aboard the Command/Service Module Casper extended the photographic and geochemical mapping of a belt around the lunar equator. A combined total of 26 separate scientific experiments were conducted in lunar orbit and during cislunar coast.

Mattingly, who remained in the command module while Young and Duke descended to the lunar surface, carried out an extravehicular activity (EVA) during the return leg of the mission to retrieve film and data packages from the science bay on the side of the service module. Although the mission of Apollo 16 was terminated one day early out of concern over several spacecraft malfunctions, all major objectives were accomplished.

=== Space Shuttle flights ===
Following his return to Earth, Mattingly served in astronaut managerial positions in the Space Shuttle development program.

Mattingly was named to command STS-4, the fourth and final orbital test flight of the Space Shuttle Columbia, launched from Kennedy Space Center, Florida, on June 27, 1982, with Henry W. Hartsfield Jr., as the pilot. This seven-day mission was designed to further verify ascent and entry phases of shuttle missions; perform continued studies of the effects of long-term thermal extremes on the orbiter subsystems; and conduct a survey of orbiter-induced contamination on the orbiter payload bay. Additionally, the crew operated several scientific experiments located in the orbiter's cabin and in the payload bay. These experiments included the Continuous Flow Electrophoresis System experiment designed to investigate the separation of biological materials in a fluid according to their surface electrical charge. This experiment was a pathfinder for the first commercial venture to capitalize on the unique characteristics of space. The crew is also credited with effecting an in-flight repair that enabled them to activate the first operational "Getaway Special" (composed of nine experiments that ranged from algae and duckweed growth in space to fruit fly and brine shrimp genetic studies). STS-4 completed 112 orbits of the Earth before landing at Edwards Air Force Base, California, on July 4, 1982. Mattingly and Hartsfield were greeted by President Ronald Reagan after the landing; Reagan recognized the pair, both graduates of Auburn University, as "you two sons of Auburn" in his welcoming speech.

STS-51-C, the first Space Shuttle Department of Defense mission, launched from Kennedy Space Center, Florida, on January 24, 1985. The crew included Mattingly (spacecraft commander), Loren Shriver (pilot), James Buchli and Ellison Onizuka (Mission Specialists), and Gary Payton (Manned Spaceflight Engineer). STS-51-C performed its DOD mission, which included deployment of a modified Inertial Upper Stage (IUS) vehicle from the Space Shuttle Discovery. Landing occurred on January 27, 1985.

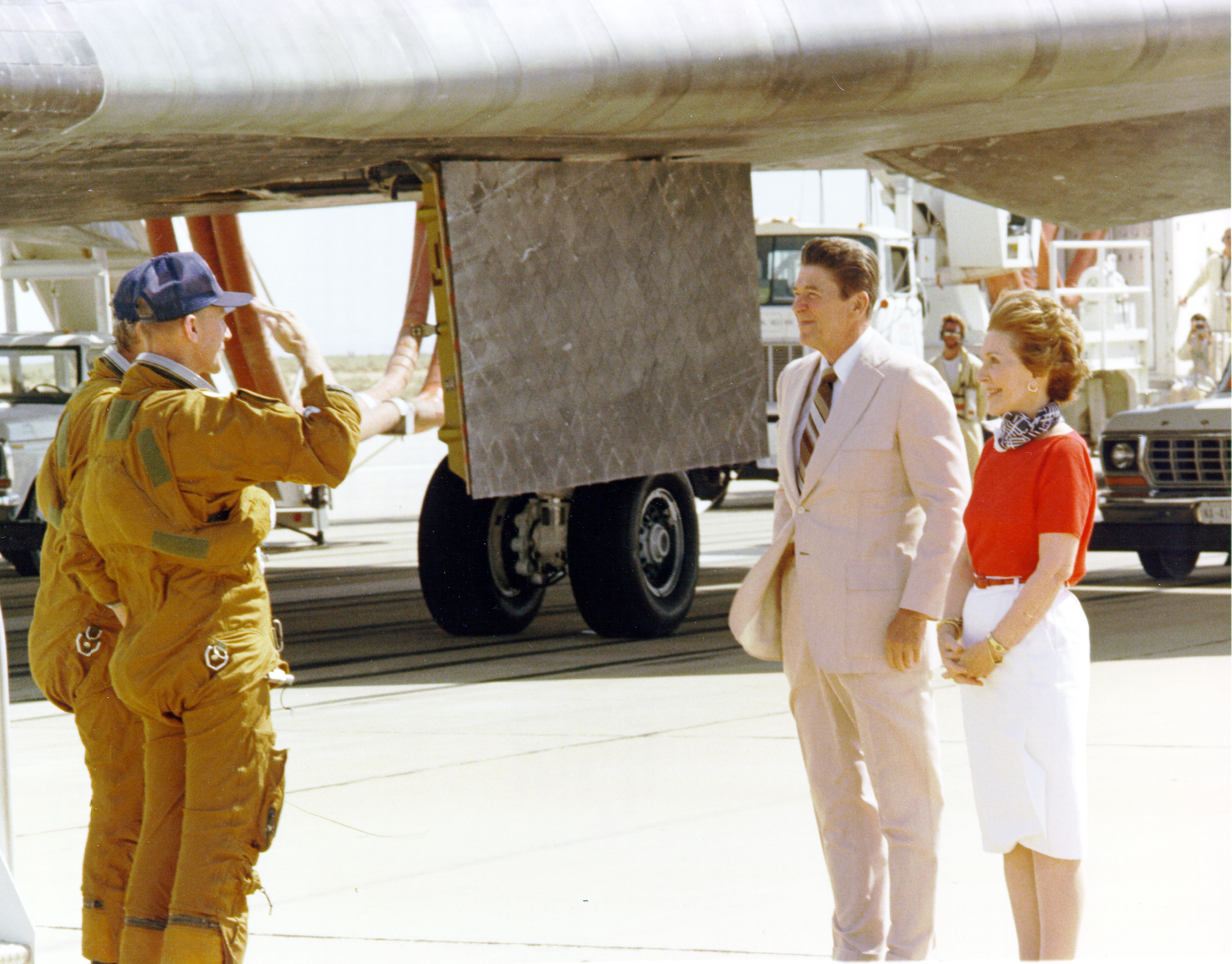
Mattingly (foreground) with Henry Hartsfield salutes President Ronald Reagan, next to First Lady Nancy Reagan, after the STS-4 landing on July 4, 1982

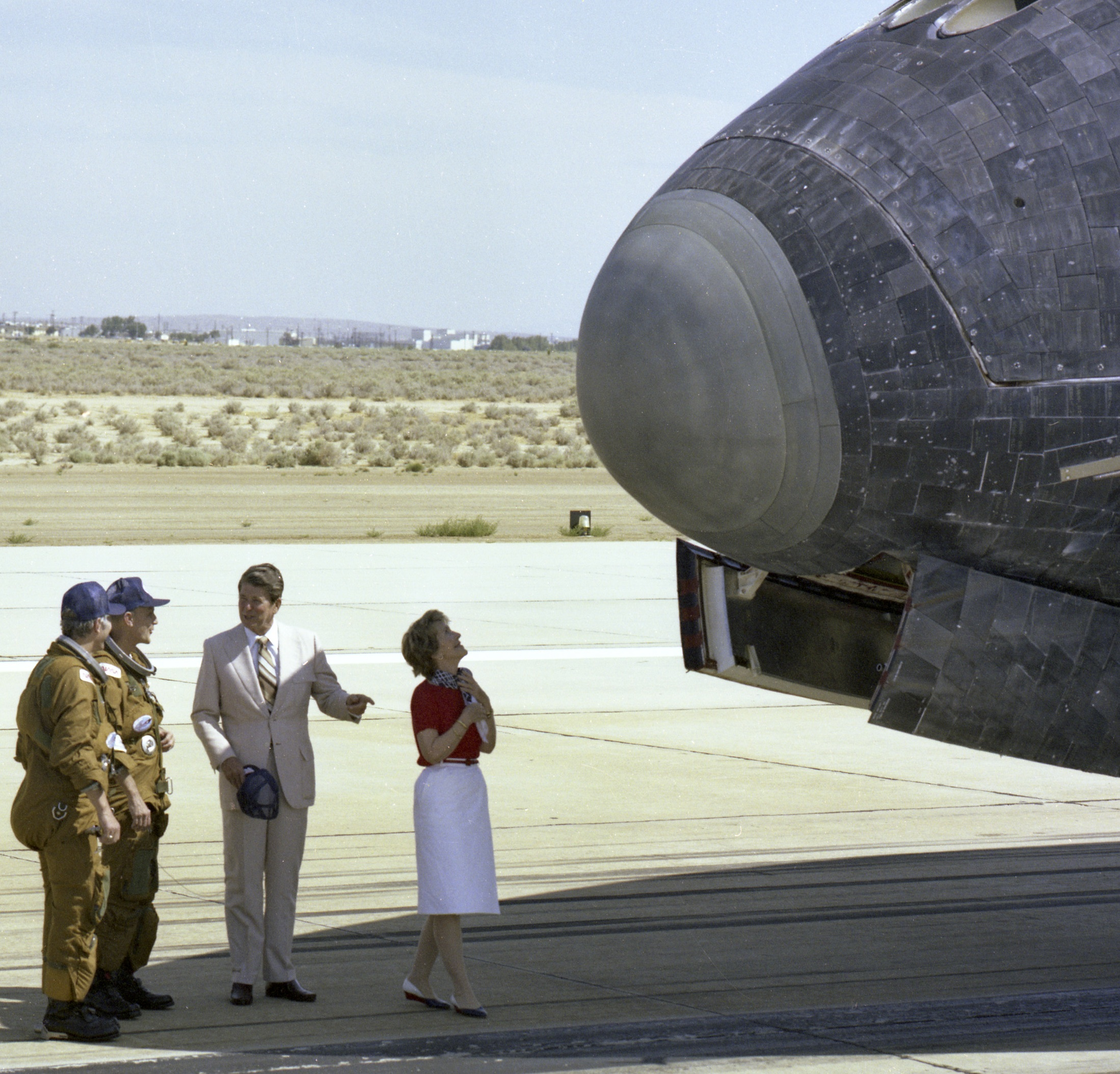
"President Ronald Reagan chats with NASA astronauts Henry Hartsfield and Thomas Mattingly on the runway as first lady Nancy Reagan scans the nose of Space Shuttle Columbia following its Independence Day landing at Edwards Air Force Base on July 4, 1982."

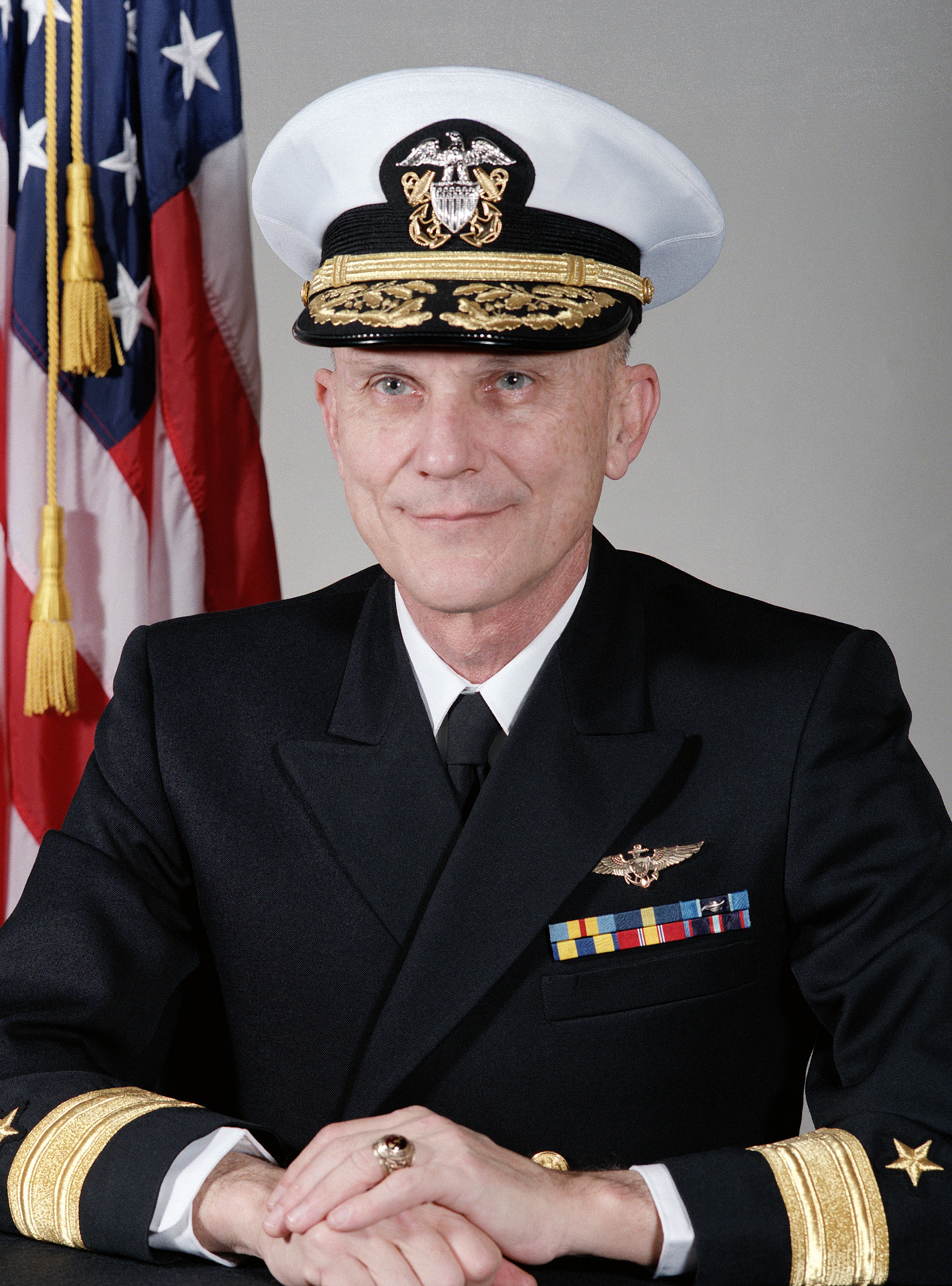
Mattingly in his Navy uniform in 1985

== Post-NASA career ==
In 1985, Mattingly retired from NASA, then retired from the Navy the following year with the two-star rank of Rear admiral (upper half), and entered the private sector. He worked as a Director in Grumman's Space Station Support Division. He then headed the Atlas booster program for General Dynamics in San Diego, California. At Lockheed Martin he was vice president in charge of the X-33 development program. He then worked at Systems Planning and Analysis in Virginia.

Mattingly logged 7,200 hours of flight time, including 5,000 hours in jet aircraft.

Mattingly was a member of many organizations. He was an associate fellow, American Institute of Aeronautics and Astronautics; fellow, American Astronautical Society; and member, Society of Experimental Test Pilots, and the U.S. Naval Institute.

== Personal life and death ==
In 1970, he married Elizabeth Dailey. They had one child, Thomas Kenneth Mattingly III.

Mattingly died in Arlington, Virginia, on October 31, 2023, at age 87. NASA announced his death two days later on November 2.

== Awards and honors ==
Mattingly was a recipient of numerous awards. He was awarded the NASA Distinguished Service Medal (2); Johnson Space Center Certificate of Commendation (1970); JSC Group Achievement Award (1972); Navy Distinguished Service Medal; Navy Expeditionary Medal; National Defense Service Medal; NASA Space Flight Medal; Navy Astronaut Wings; Society of Experimental Test Pilots Ivan C. Kincheloe Award (1972); Delta Tau Delta Achievement Award (1972); Auburn Alumni Engineers Council Outstanding Achievement Award (1972); American Astronautical Society Flight Achievement Award for 1972; AIAA Haley Astronautics Award for 1973; Fédération Aéronautique Internationale awarded him the V. M. Komarov Diploma in 1973; Department of Defense Distinguished Service Medal (1982).

Mattingly was inducted with a group of Apollo astronauts into the International Space Hall of Fame in 1983. He was one of 24 Apollo astronauts who were inducted into the U.S. Astronaut Hall of Fame in 1997. His name also appears on The Astronaut Monument in Húsavík, Iceland, commemorating 32 Apollo astronauts who were sent to Iceland for geological training in the 1960s.

== In media ==
Mattingly was portrayed by Gary Sinise in the 1995 movie Apollo 13 and by Željko Ivanek in the 1998 HBO miniseries From the Earth to the Moon. Interviews with Mattingly were also used as part of the narrative track on the 1989 documentary film For All Mankind.
