= Ellison Onizuka =

American astronaut and engineer (1946–1986)

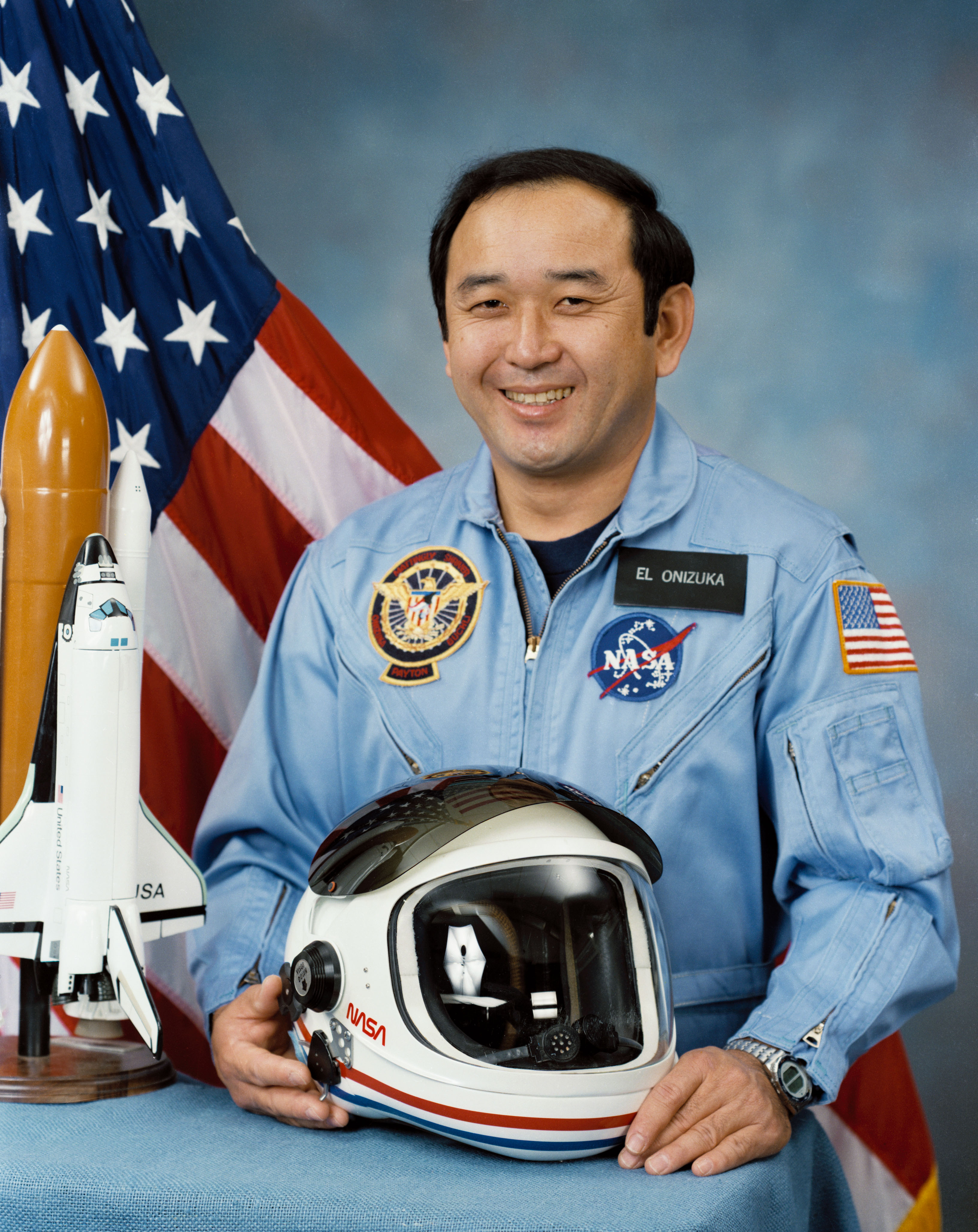
- Onizuka, c. 1980
- Born: Ellison Shoji Onizuka; June 24, 1946; Kealakekua, Hawaii Territory, U.S.
- Died: January 28, 1986 (aged 39); North Atlantic Ocean
- Cause of death: Space Shuttle Challenger disaster
- Education: University of Colorado, Boulder (BS, MS)
- Awards: Congressional Space Medal of Honor
- Space career

NASA astronaut
- Rank: Colonel, USAF
- Time in space: 3d 1h 33m
- Selection: NASA Group 8 (1978)
- Mission: STS-51-C; STS-51-L

Ellison Shoji Onizuka (Japanese: エリソン・ショージ・オニヅカ, 鬼塚 承次, Hepburn: Onizuka Shōji; June 24, 1946 – January 28, 1986) was an American astronaut, engineer, and U.S. Air Force flight test engineer from Kealakekua, Hawaii, who successfully flew into space with the Space Shuttle Discovery on STS-51-C. He died in the destruction of the Space Shuttle Challenger, on which he was serving as Mission Specialist for mission STS-51-L. Onizuka was the first Asian American and the first person of Japanese ancestry to reach space.

== Early life ==
Onizuka was born on June 24, 1946, to Japanese American parents Masamitsu and Mitsue Onizuka. He was a Buddhist. Onizuka had two older sisters, Shirley and Norma, and a younger brother, Claude, who became the family spokesman after the Challenger disaster. Growing up, Onizuka was an active participant in FFA, 4-H, and the Boy Scouts of America, where he reached the level of Eagle Scout.

Onizuka graduated from Konawaena High School in 1964. He received a Bachelor of Science degree in Aerospace Engineering in June 1969 and a Master of Science degree in that field the following December from the University of Colorado Boulder. Onizuka participated in the Air Force Reserve Officer Training Corps during his time there and is an alumnus of Triangle Fraternity, the AFROTC Arnold Air Society, as well as a member of the Tau Beta Pi honor society.

Onizuka married Lorna Leiko Yoshida on June 7, 1969, while completing his studies at the University of Colorado. They had two daughters, Janelle Onizuka-Gillilan (b. 1969) and Darien Lei Shizue Onizuka-Morgan (b. 1975).

== Air Force career ==
On January 15, 1970, Onizuka entered active duty with the United States Air Force, where he served as a flight test engineer at Sacramento Air Logistics Center at McClellan Air Force Base. Onizuka worked in test flight programs and systems security engineering for the F-84, F-100, F-105, F-111, EC-121T, T-33, T-39, T-28, and A-1.

From August 1974 to July 1975, Onizuka attended the U.S. Air Force Test Pilot School. In July 1975, he was assigned to the Flight Test Center at Edwards Air Force Base in California. Onizuka became a squadron flight test engineer at the USAF Test Pilot School and later worked as a manager for engineering support in the training resources division. His duties there consisted of course instruction and management of the airship fleet (A-7, A-37, T-38, F-4, T-33, and NKC-135) being used for the Test Pilot School and Flight Test Center. While at the school, Onizuka registered more than 1,700 flight hours.

== NASA career ==
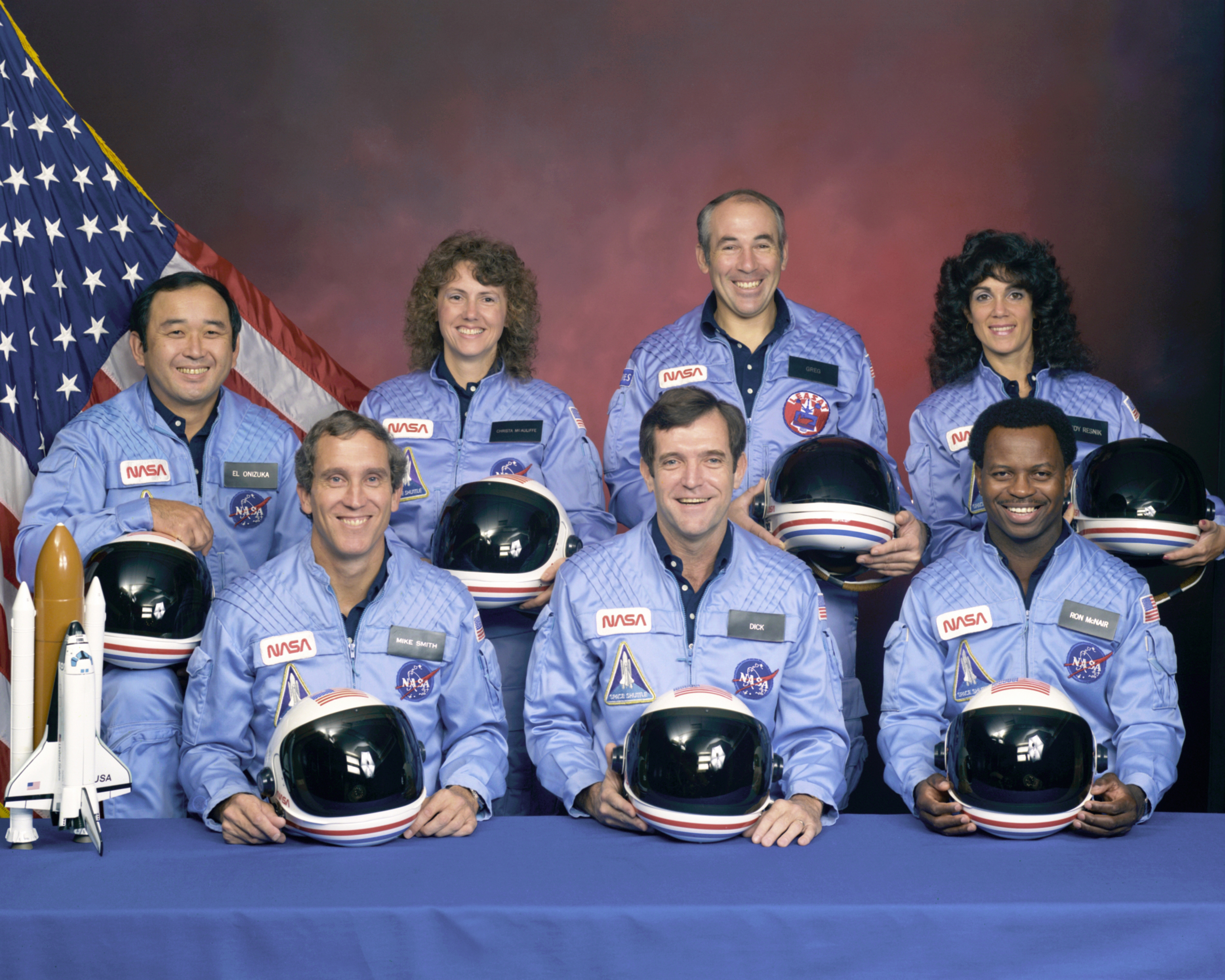
The STS-51L Crew

Onizuka was selected for the astronaut program in January 1978 and completed one year of evaluation and training in August 1979. Later, he worked in the experimentation team, Orbiter test team, and launch support crew at Kennedy Space Center for the STS-1 and STS-2. At NASA, Onizuka worked on the Shuttle Avionics Integration Laboratory (SAIL) test and revision software team.

Onizuka's first space mission took place on January 24, 1985, with the launch of mission STS-51-C on Space Shuttle Discovery, the first Space Shuttle mission for the Department of Defense. He was accompanied by Commander Ken Mattingly, Pilot Loren Shriver, fellow Mission Specialist James Buchli, and Payload Specialist Gary E. Payton. During the mission, Onizuka was responsible for the activities of the primary payloads, which included the unfolding of the Inertial Upper Stage (IUS) surface. After 48 orbits around the Earth, Discovery landed at Kennedy Space Center on January 27, 1985. Onizuka had completed a total of 74 hours in space.

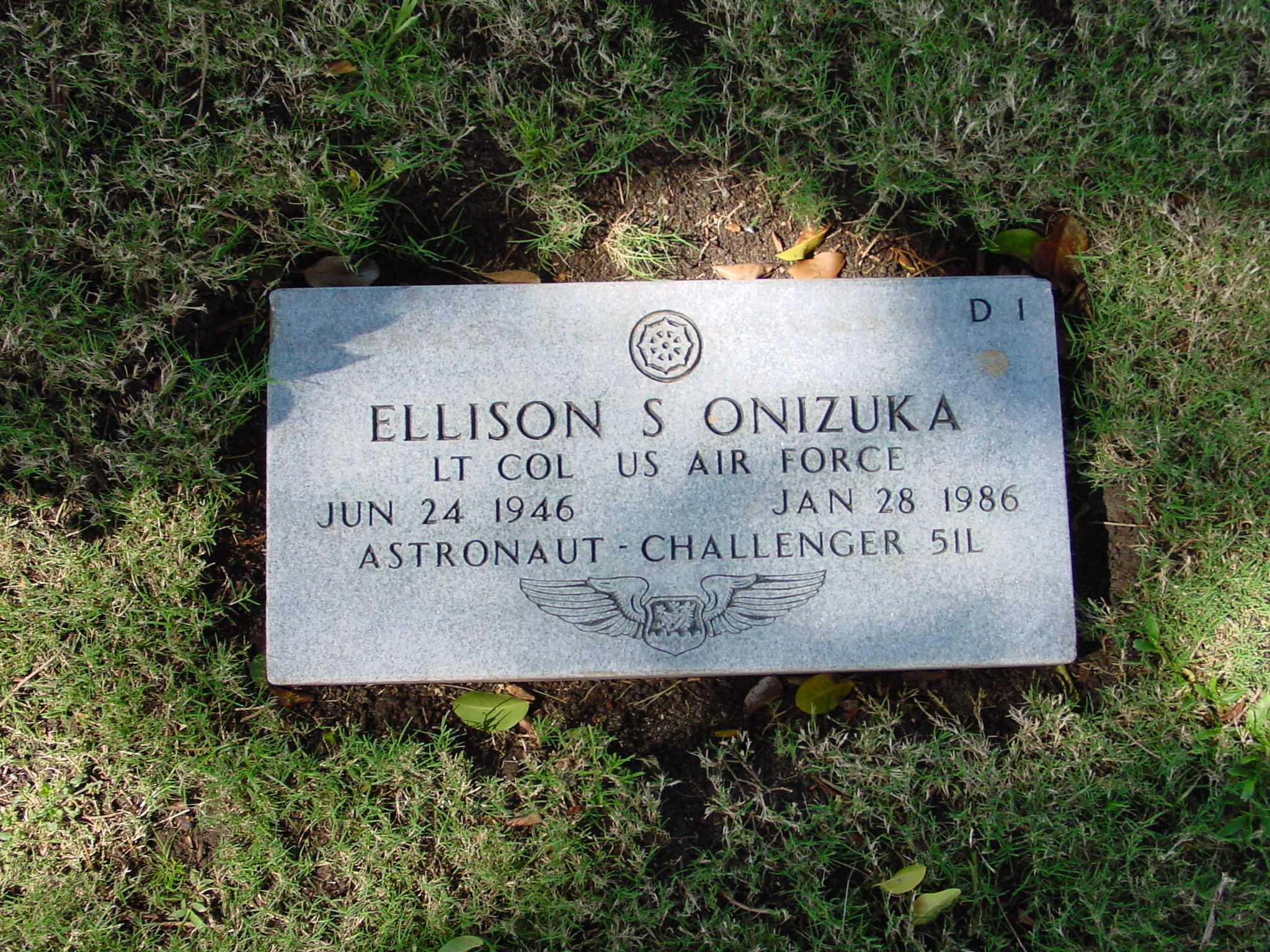
Gravesite of Onizuka

Onizuka was assigned to the mission STS-51-L on the Space Shuttle Challenger that took off from Kennedy Space Center at 11:38:00 EST (16:38:00 UTC) on January 28, 1986. The other Challenger crew members were commander Dick Scobee, pilot Michael J. Smith, mission specialists Ronald McNair, Judith Resnik, and payload specialists Gregory Jarvis and Christa McAuliffe. The shuttle was destroyed when a flame jet leaking from a solid rocket booster ruptured the liquid hydrogen fuel tank 73 seconds after launch. All seven crew members were killed.

Following the Challenger disaster, examination of the recovered vehicle cockpit revealed that three of the crew members' Personal Egress Air Packs were activated: those of Onizuka, Resnik, and Smith. The location of Smith's activation switch, on the back side of his seat, means that either Resnik or Onizuka could have activated it for him. This is the only evidence available from the disaster that shows Onizuka and Resnik were alive after the cockpit separated from the vehicle. However, if the cabin had lost pressure, the packs alone would not have sustained the crew during the two-minute descent.

Onizuka is buried at the National Memorial Cemetery of the Pacific in Honolulu. At the time of his death, Onizuka held the rank of lieutenant colonel. He was posthumously promoted to the rank of colonel.

== Memberships and distinctions ==
Onizuka belonged to the following organizations: Society of Flight Test Engineers, the Air Force Association, the American Institute of Aeronautics and Astronautics, Tau Beta Pi, Sigma Tau, Arnold Air Society, and Triangle Fraternity.

Among Onizuka's distinctions are the Air Force Meritorious Service Medal, Air Force Commendation Medal, Air Force Outstanding Unit Award, Air Force Organizational Excellence Award, National Defense Service Medal, Air and Space Longevity Service Award, and NASA Space Flight Medal. He was posthumously awarded the Congressional Space Medal of Honor.

== Legacy ==
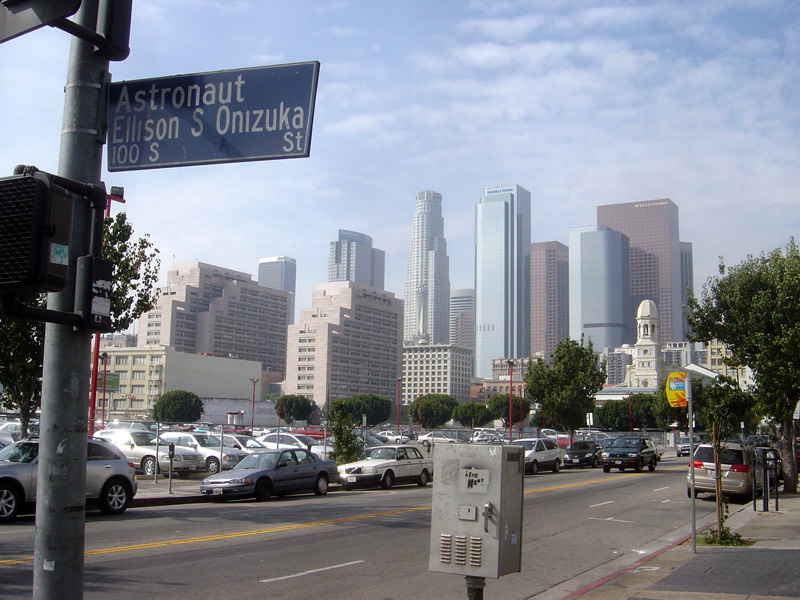
Downtown Los Angeles as seen from the corner of Ellison S. Onizuka St., San Pedro St. and 2nd St. in Little Tokyo

Onizuka Air Force Station (defunct as of 2010) in Sunnyvale, California, and Onizuka Village family housing on Hickam Air Force Base are dedicated to Onizuka.

The Ellison S. Onizuka Space Center at Kona International Airport in the Kona district of Hawaiʻi island, where he was born and raised, was dedicated to Onizuka. The center closed in March 2016 and was unable to find a suitable location to reopen. Select items from the center's collection have been put on permanent display at the Japanese Cultural Center of Hawaii in Mōʻiliʻili on the island of Oahu. They not only feature Onizuka's personal items, but also the only Moon rock in Hawaii and the space suit from Apollo 13 astronaut Fred Haise.

Two astronomical features were also named after Onizuka: an asteroid discovered by Edward L. G. Bowell on February 8, 1984, 3355 Onizuka and a 29-km-diameter crater on the Moon, Onizuka. The Cygnus NG-16 ISS resupply spacecraft was also named after Onizuka (S.S. Ellison Onizuka).

Little Tokyo in Los Angeles has a street named after Onizuka, as does the street surrounding Whitcomb Elementary School in Clear Lake City, Houston, Texas, where his daughters attended. It also named its library the Onizuka Memorial Library. (At the time of the Challenger disaster, his older daughter, Janelle, attended Clear Lake High School. His younger daughter, Darien Lei, was at Whitcomb.) In addition, Onizuka Street in Little Tokyo has a scale replica of the Challenger as a memorial, and a permanent memorial to Onizuka is located in the lobby of the Hompa Hongwanji Buddhist Temple.

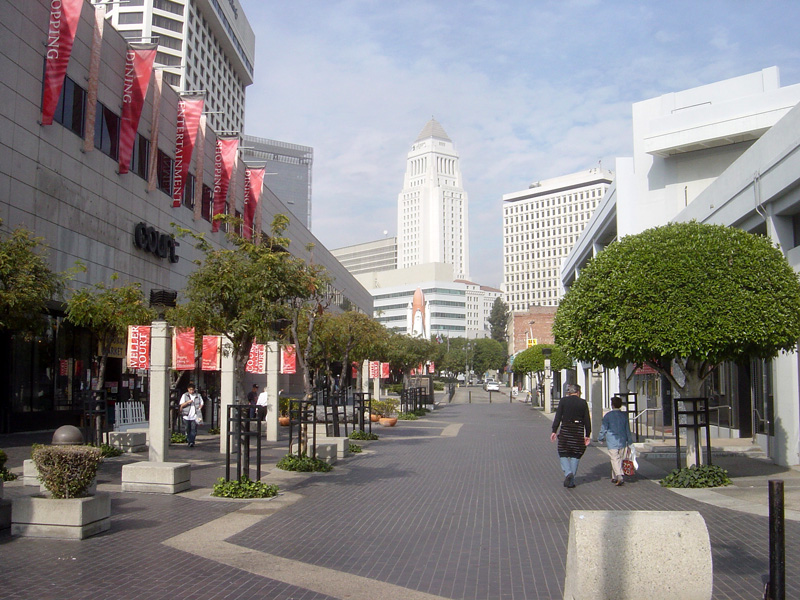
Weller Court shopping plaza (left) and Onizuka St., with Los Angeles City Hall in the background

The Onizuka Center for International Astronomy, named in Onizuka's honor, is the mid-level support and visitor complex for the Mauna Kea Observatories in Hawaii. It includes a Visitor Information Station as well as dining, lodging, office, and maintenance facilities for observatory staff and astronomers. A plaque of his face is mounted on a boulder by the entrance to the Visitor Information Station. Triangle Fraternity has the Ellison Onizuka Young Alumnus Award in tribute to Onizuka.

The Ann & H.J. Smead Aerospace Engineering Sciences building at the University of Colorado at Boulder features a conference room named after Onizuka on the third floor. The Arnold Air Society Squadron attached to the 105th Air Force Reserve Officer Training Corps Detachment at the University of Colorado at Boulder bears his name.

Standard U.S. passports feature a quote from Onizuka on its last page: "Every generation has the obligation to free men's minds for a look at new worlds ... to look out from a higher plateau than the last generation. Ellison S. Onizuka".

The Hawaii Space Grant Consortium holds an annual Astronaut Ellison Onizuka Science Day at the University of Hawaiʻi at Hilo for students in grades 4–12, parents and teachers. El Camino College in Torrance, California hosts an annual Onizuka Space Science Day, jointly organized by the Onizuka Memorial Committee.

The students at the United States Air Force Test Pilot School present the Onizuka Prop Wash Award to the classmate who contributed most to class spirit and morale.

On January 1, 2017, the airport in Onizuka's home district of Kona was renamed Ellison Onizuka Kona International Airport at Keāhole.

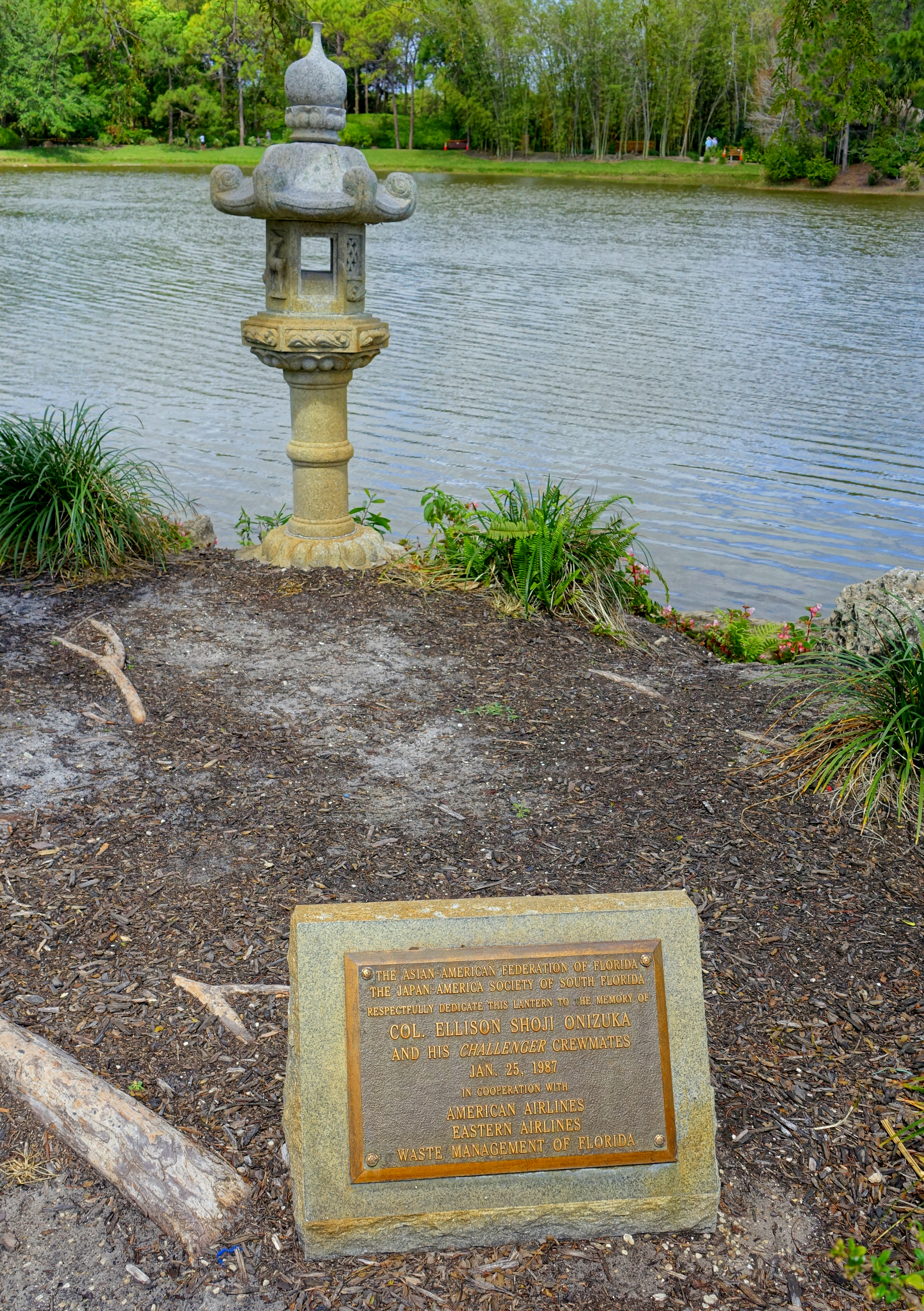
Ellison Onizuka and Challenger Crewmates memorial lantern in Morikami Museum and Japanese Gardens in Palm Beach County, Florida

Clear Lake High School, where Onizuka's daughters went to school, has on display a soccer ball that was on board the Challenger during the accident. It was given to Onizuka on behalf of the soccer team that he coached, and for which his daughters played, to be brought into space. The ball was retrieved during the recovery efforts and donated to the school. In 2016, Col. Robert Kimbrough on Expedition 49/50 brought the ball into space.

A Cygnus resupply vehicle on ISS resupply mission Cygnus NG-16 was named the SS Ellison Onizuka in his honor. It launched on August 10, 2021, and arrived at the ISS two days later.

The Morikami Museum and Japanese Gardens has a memorial and lamp dedicated to the seven astronauts who died on the Challenger, including Ellison Onizuka.

=== In media ===
- Onizuka was portrayed by Keone Young in the 1990 TV movie Challenger.
- In Star Trek: The Next Generation, a shuttlecraft carried aboard the USS Enterprise (NCC-1701-D) bears Onizuka's name, as seen in the three episodes "The Ensigns of Command", "The Mind's Eye" and "The Outcast."

== See also ==
- List of Asian American astronauts

== Sources ==
- This article draws heavily on the corresponding article in the Spanish-language Wikipedia, which was accessed in the version of July 8, 2005.
