= STS-33 =

1989 American crewed spaceflight for the Department of Defense

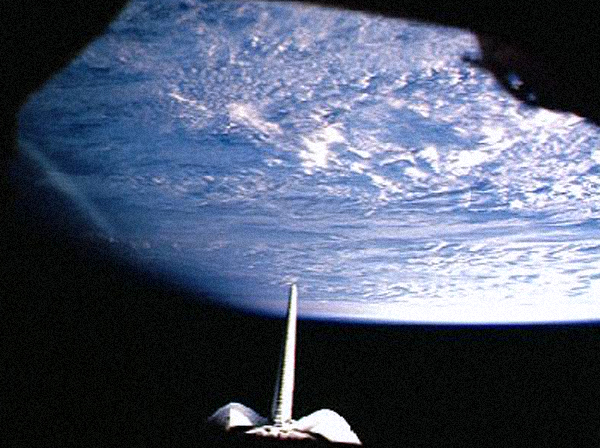
- Discovery in orbit; in-flight photography on this Department of Defense (DoD) support mission is limited.
- Names: Space Transportation System-33; STS-33R
- Mission type: DoD satellite deployment
- Operator: NASA
- COSPAR ID: 1989-090A
- SATCAT no.: 20329
- Mission duration: 6 days, 6 minutes, 48 seconds
- Distance travelled: 3,400,000 km (2,100,000 mi)
- Orbits completed: 79

Spacecraft properties
- Spacecraft: Space Shuttle Discovery
- Landing mass: 88,125 kg (194,282 lb)
- Payload mass: 21,000 kg (46,000 lb)

Crew
- Crew size: 5
- Members: Frederick D. Gregory; John E. Blaha; Sonny Carter; Story Musgrave; Kathryn C. Thornton

Start of mission
- Launch date: November 22, 1989, 00:23:30 UTC (7:23 pm EST)
- Launch site: Kennedy, LC-39B
- Contractor: Rockwell International

End of mission
- Landing date: November 28, 1989, 00:30:18 UTC (4:30:18 pm PDT)
- Landing site: Edwards, Runway 4

Orbital parameters
- Reference system: Geocentric orbit
- Regime: Low Earth orbit
- Perigee altitude: 519 km (322 mi)
- Apogee altitude: 519 km (322 mi)
- Inclination: 28.45°
- Period: 88.70 minutes

Instruments
- Air Force Maui Optical and Supercomputing observatory (AMOS); Enhanced Longwave Spectral Imager (ELSI)
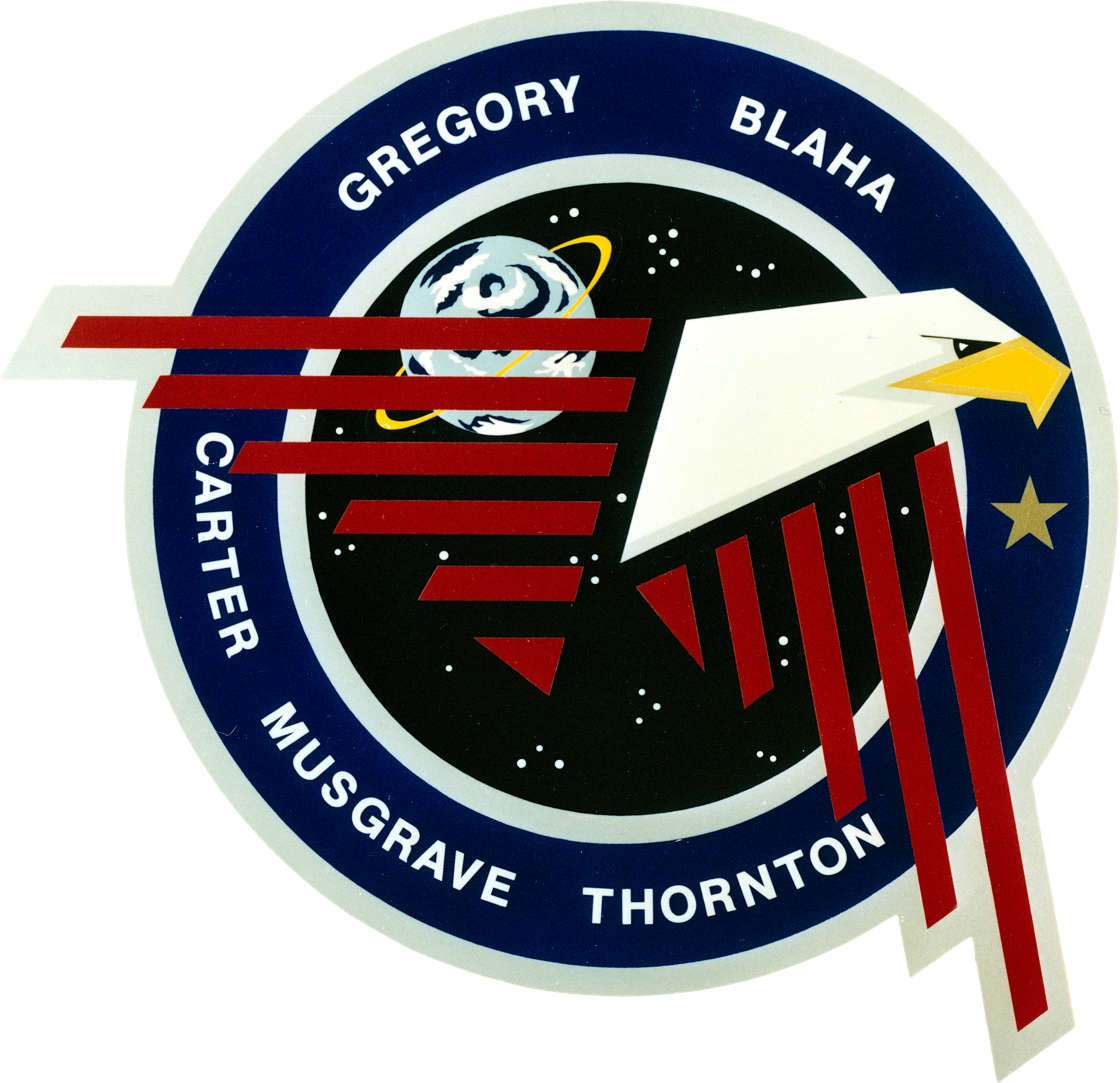
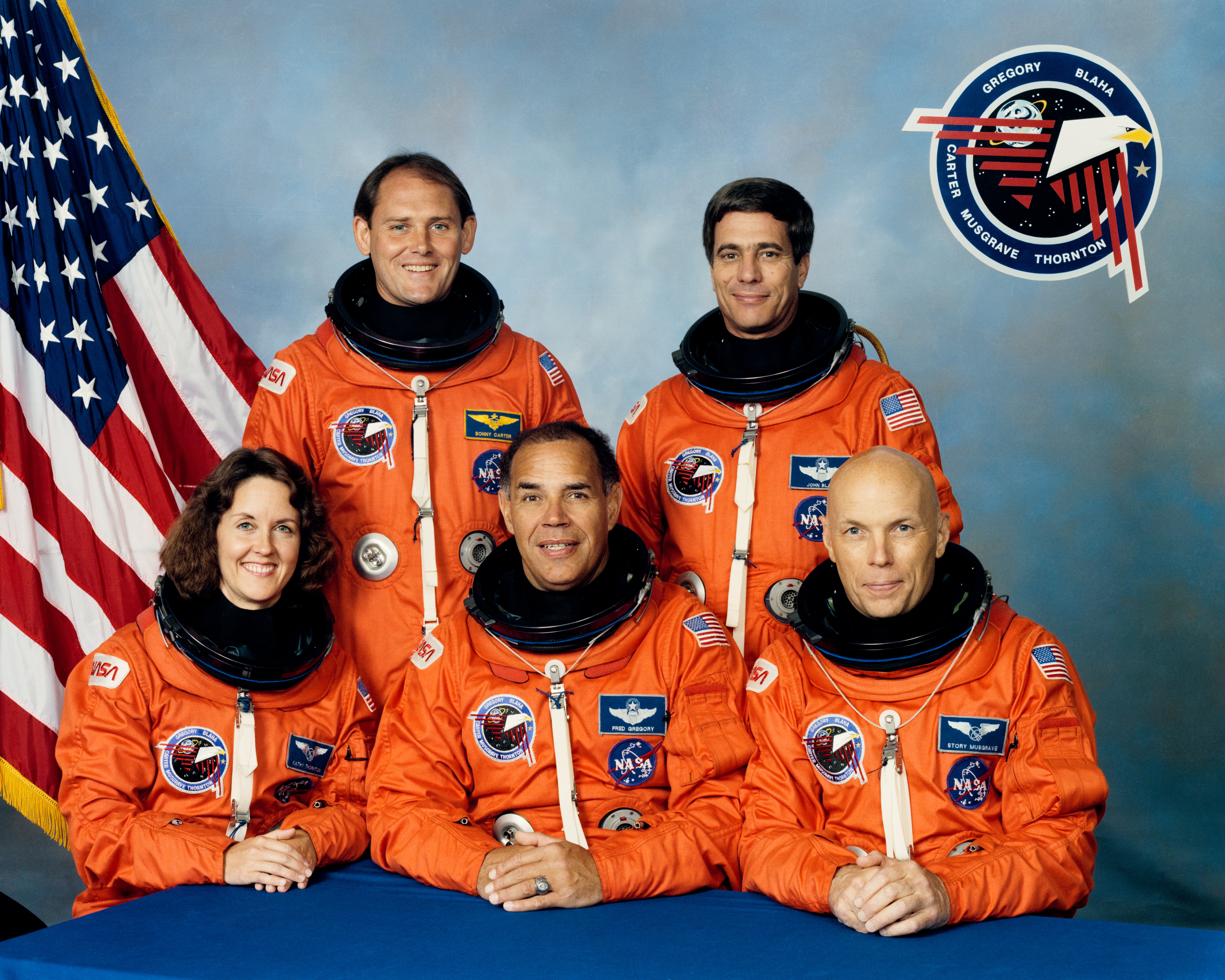
- STS-33 mission patch Back row: Carter and Blaha; Front row: Thornton, Gregory and Musgrave Space Shuttle program

STS-33 was a NASA Space Shuttle mission and the 9th flight of Discovery, during which Space Shuttle Discovery deployed a payload for the United States Department of Defense (DoD). It was the 32nd shuttle mission overall, the ninth flight of Discovery, the fifth shuttle mission in support of the DoD, the seventh post-Space Shuttle Challenger disaster mission and the last Shuttle mission of the 1980s. Due to the nature of the mission, specific details remain classified. Discovery lifted off from Launch Complex 39B at Kennedy Space Center (KSC), Florida, on November 22, 1989, at 7:23:30 p.m. EST; it landed at Edwards Air Force Base, California, on November 27, 1989, at 7:30:16 p.m. EST.

The mission was officially designated STS-33R as the original STS-33 designator belonged to the ill-fated Challenger STS-51-L, the 25th Space Shuttle mission. Official documentation for that mission contained the designator STS-33 throughout. As STS-51-L was designated STS-33, future flights with the STS-26 through STS-33 designators would require the R in their documentation to avoid conflicts in tracking data from one mission to another.

== Crew ==
Position	Astronaut
Commander	Frederick D. Gregory; Second spaceflight
Pilot	John E. Blaha; Second spaceflight
Mission Specialist 1	Sonny Carter; Only spaceflight
Mission Specialist 2 Flight Engineer	Story Musgrave; Third spaceflight
Mission Specialist 3	Kathryn C. Thornton; First spaceflight

=== Crew seat assignments ===
Seat	Launch	Landing	Seats 1–4 are on the flight deck. Seats 5–7 are on the mid-deck.
1	Gregory		Seats 1–4 are on the flight deck. Seats 5–7 are on the mid-deck.
2	Blaha		Seats 1–4 are on the flight deck. Seats 5–7 are on the mid-deck.
3	Carter	Thornton	Seats 1–4 are on the flight deck. Seats 5–7 are on the mid-deck.
4	Musgrave		Seats 1–4 are on the flight deck. Seats 5–7 are on the mid-deck.
5	Thornton	Carter	Seats 1–4 are on the flight deck. Seats 5–7 are on the mid-deck.
6	Unused		Seats 1–4 are on the flight deck. Seats 5–7 are on the mid-deck.
7	Unused		Seats 1–4 are on the flight deck. Seats 5–7 are on the mid-deck.

== Mission background ==
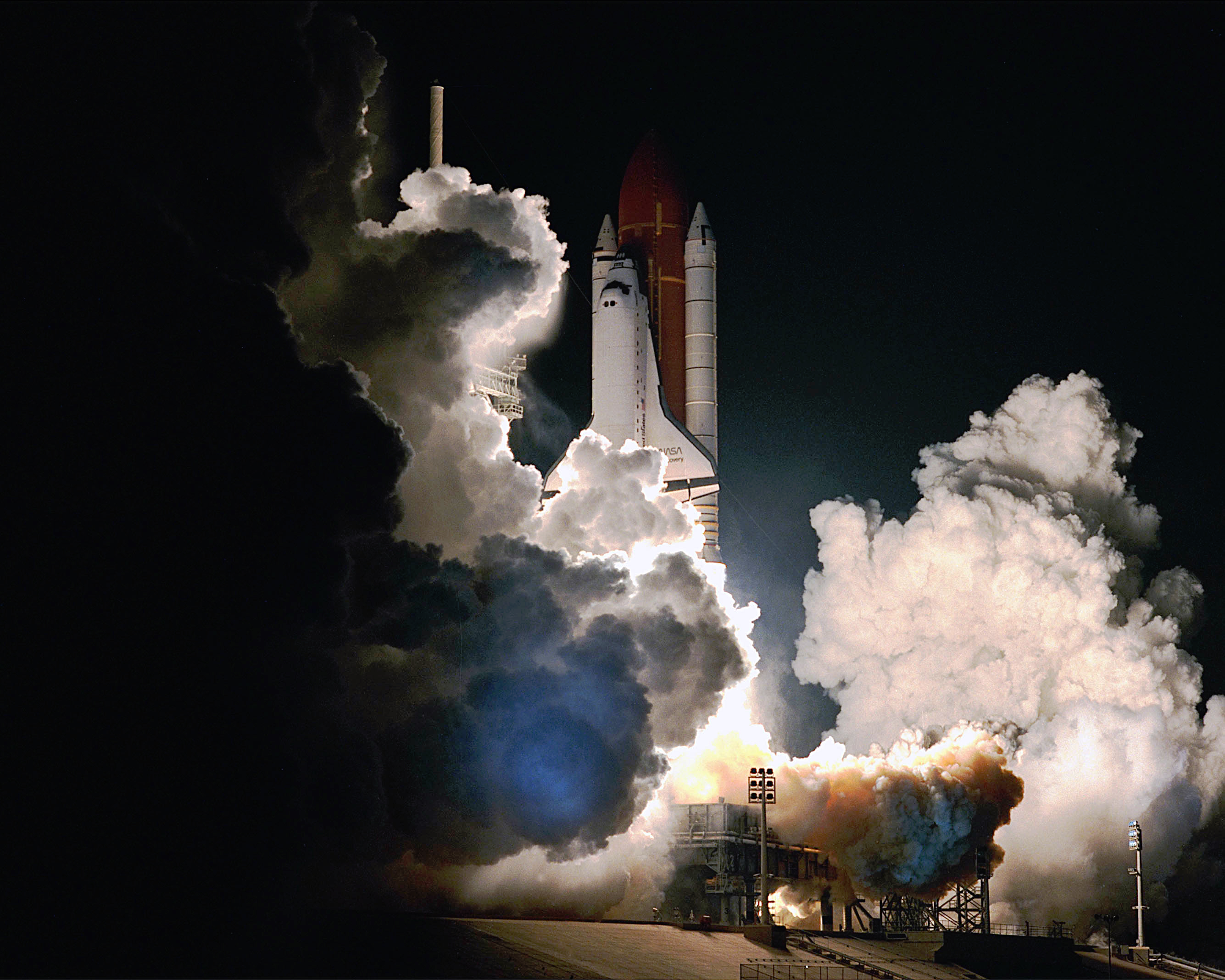
Launch of STS-33

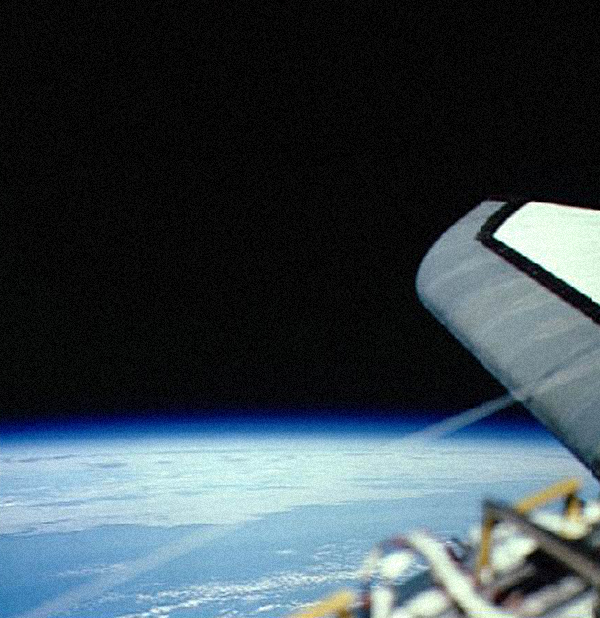
The shuttle's wing and Earth's horizon

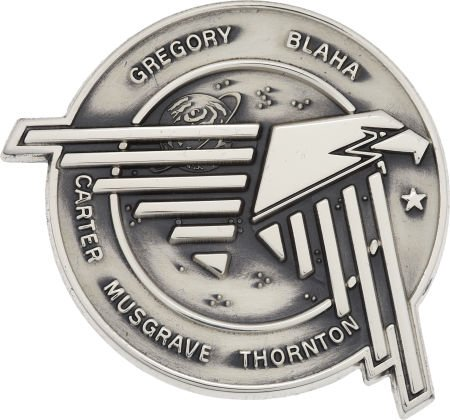
STS-33 Robbins Medallion

STS-33 was the original designation for the mission that became STS-51-L, the Challenger disaster. After Challenger's destruction, NASA recycled the mission numbering system back to STS-26, which was the 26th shuttle mission and the first to fly after the disaster.

S. David Griggs, a veteran of STS-51-D, was to have been the pilot of this mission. He was killed in the crash of a vintage World War II aircraft in June 1989 while training to serve as pilot on STS-33, and is commemorated on the mission insignia with a single gold star on the blue field. He was replaced by John Blaha. Sonny Carter, a mission specialist on this flight, was killed in a commercial plane crash on April 5, 1991 while training to fly on STS-42.

== Mission summary ==
STS-33 was originally scheduled to launch on November 20, 1989, but was delayed because of problems with the integrated electronics assemblies which controlled the ignition and separation of the shuttle's solid rocket boosters (SRBs). STS-33 was the third night launch of the Space Shuttle program, and the first since shuttle flights resumed in 1988 following the Challenger disaster of 1986.

During the mission, Discovery deployed a single satellite, USA-48 (1989-090B). Experts believe that this was a secret Magnum ELINT (ELectronic INTelligence) satellite headed for geosynchronous orbit, similar to that launched by STS-51-C in 1985, making this mission essentially a duplicate of that earlier mission. According to Jim Slade of ABC News, USA-48 was intended to eavesdrop on military and diplomatic communications from the Soviet Union, China, and other communist states. The satellite deployed by STS-33 was a replacement for the one launched by STS-51-C, which was running out of the maneuvering fuel required for keeping its station over the Indian Ocean. However, astronaut Gary E. Payton stated in 2009 that STS-51-C's payload is "still up there, and still operating".

Aviation Week claimed that during STS-33, the shuttle initially entered an 204 km (127 mi) x 519 km (322 mi) orbit at an inclination of 28.45° to the equator. It then executed three Orbital Maneuvering System (OMS) burns, the last on its fourth orbit. The first burn was to circularize the orbit at 519 km (322 mi). The satellite was deployed on the seventh orbit, and ignited its Inertial Upper Stage (IUS) booster at the ascending node of the eighth orbit, successfully placing it in a geostationary transfer orbit (GTO). This was the eighth IUS launched aboard the shuttle, and the seventh successfully deployed.

STS-33 suffered a cabin leak in the Waste Collection System.

STS-33 was observed by the 1.6 m (5 ft 3 in) telescope of the U.S. Air Force Air Force Maui Optical and Supercomputing observatory (AMOS) during five passes over Hawaii. Spectrographic and infrared images of the shuttle obtained with the Enhanced Longwave Spectral Imager (ELSI) were aimed at studying the interactions between gases released by the shuttle's primary reaction control system (RCS) and residual atmospheric oxygen and nitrogen species in orbit.

The landing was initially scheduled for November 26, 1989, but was postponed for a day because of strong winds at the landing site. Discovery landed at Edwards Air Force Base, California, on November 27, 1989, at 7:30:16 p.m. EST, after a mission duration of 5 days, 0 hour, 6 minutes, and 46 seconds.

== See also ==
- List of human spaceflights
- List of Space Shuttle missions
- Militarization of space
