= Cygnus NG-16 =

2021 American resupply spaceflight to the ISS

NG-16
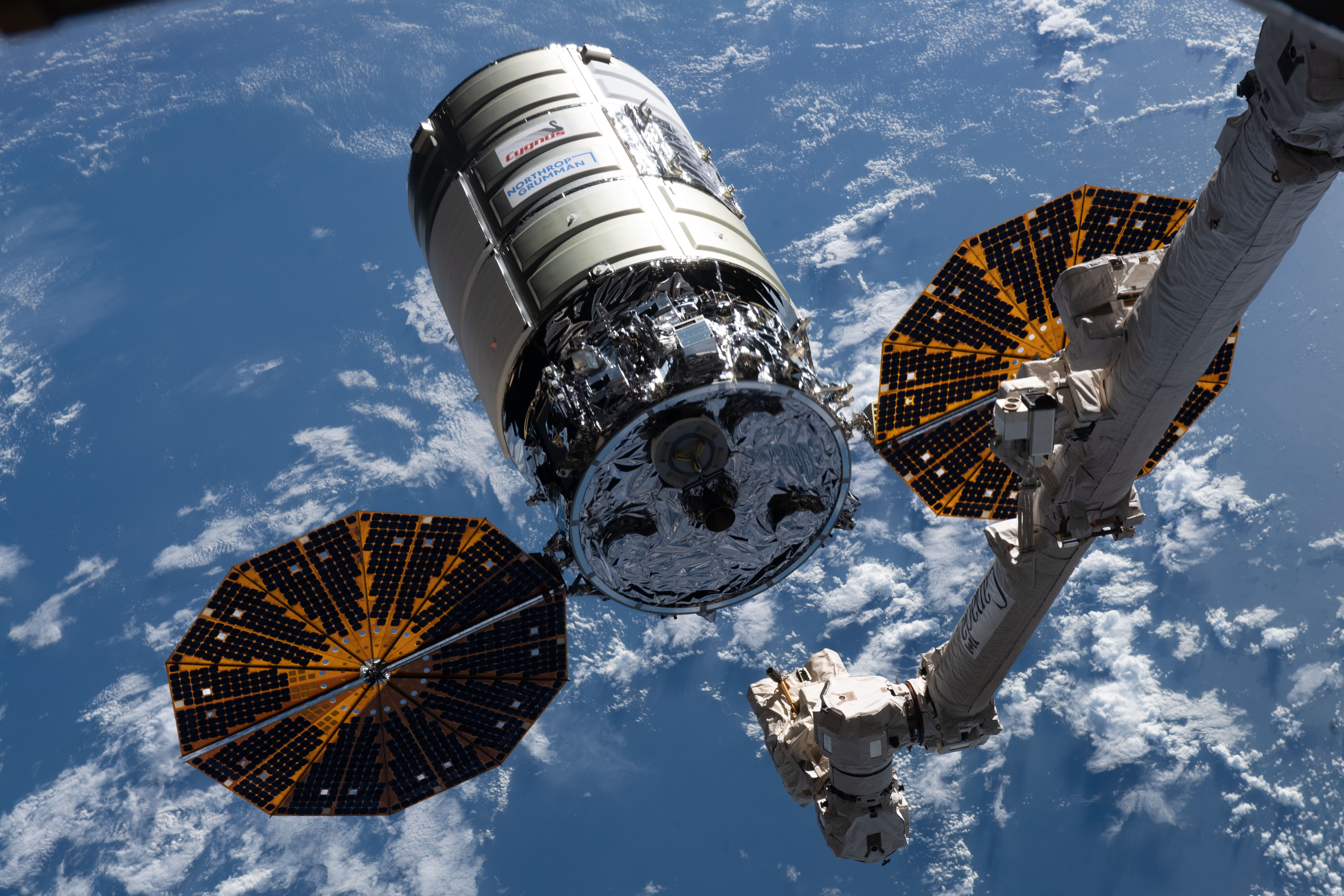
- S.S. Ellison Onizuka on arrival at the ISS
- Names: CRS NG-16; CRS OA-16 (2016–2018)
- Mission type: ISS resupply
- Operator: Northrop Grumman
- COSPAR ID: 2021-072A
- SATCAT no.: 49064
- Website: Cygnus NG-16
- Mission duration: 126 days, 8 hours, 23 minutes

Spacecraft properties
- Spacecraft: S.S. Ellison Onizuka
- Spacecraft type: Enhanced Cygnus
- Manufacturer: Northrop Grumman; Thales Alenia Space
- Launch mass: 8,041 kg (17,727 lb)
- Payload mass: 3,723 kg (8,208 lb)

Start of mission
- Launch date: 10 August 2021, 22:01:05 UTC (6:01:05 pm EDT)
- Rocket: Antares 230+
- Launch site: MARS, Pad 0A

End of mission
- Disposal: Deorbited
- Decay date: 15 December 2021, 06:25 UTC

Orbital parameters
- Reference system: Geocentric orbit
- Regime: Low Earth orbit
- Inclination: 51.66°

Berthing at ISS
- Berthing port: Unity nadir
- RMS capture: 12 August 2021, 10:07 UTC
- Berthing date: 12 August 2021, 13:42 UTC
- Unberthing date: 20 November 2021, 13:40 UTC
- RMS release: 20 November 2021, 16:01 UTC
- Time berthed: 99 days, 23 hours, 58 minutes

Cargo
- Mass: 3,723 kg (8,208 lb)
- Pressurised: 3,675 kg (8,102 lb)
- Unpressurised: 48 kg (106 lb)
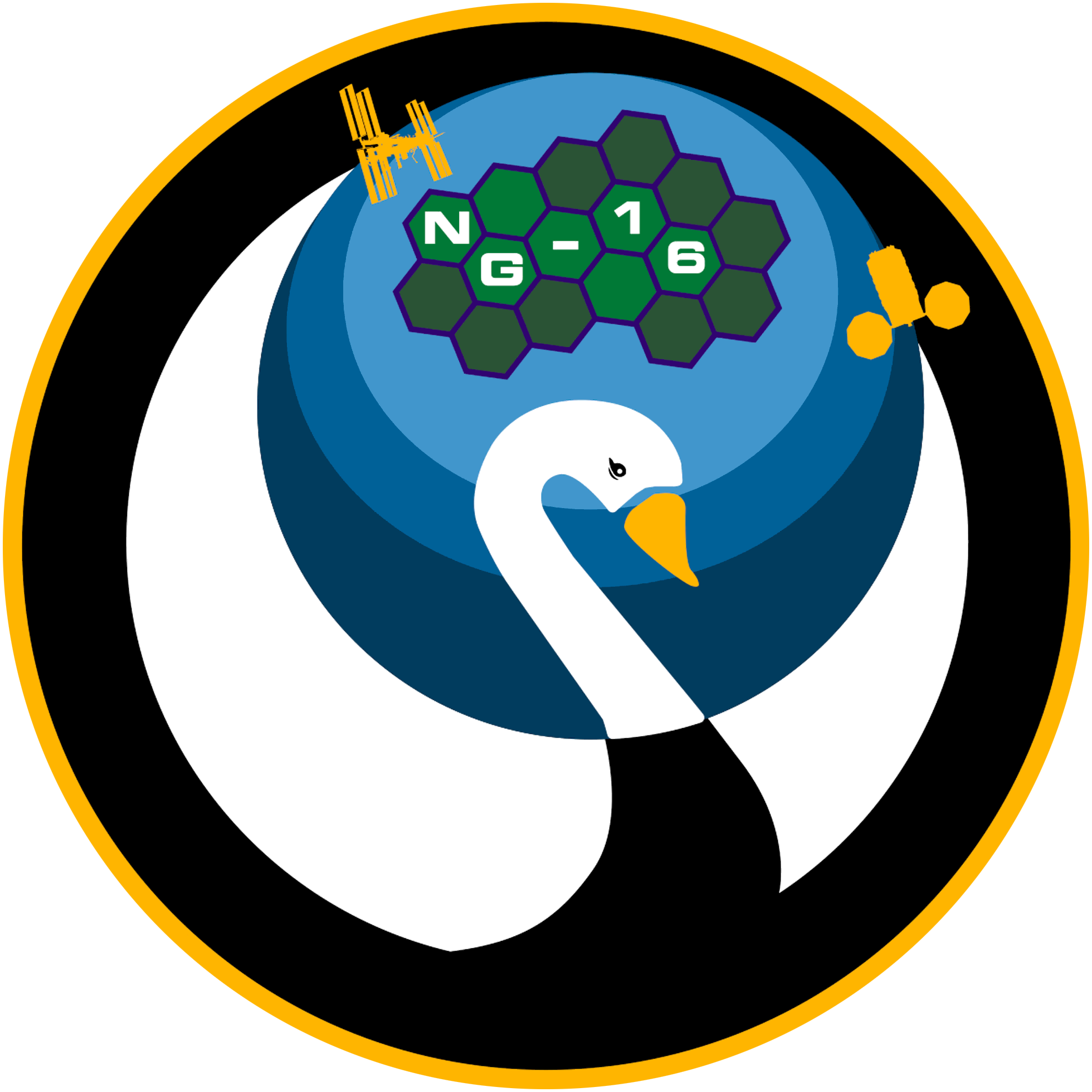
- NASA mission patch Commercial Resupply Services Cygnus flights

NG-16, previously known as OA-16, was the sixteenth flight of the Northrop Grumman robotic resupply spacecraft Cygnus and its fifteenth flight to the International Space Station (ISS) under the Commercial Resupply Services (CRS-2) contract with NASA. The mission was launched on 10 August 2021 at 22:01:05 UTC, for a (planned) 90-day mission at the ISS. This was the fifth launch of Cygnus under the CRS-2 contract.

Orbital ATK (now Northrop Grumman Innovation Systems) and NASA jointly developed a new space transportation system to provide commercial cargo resupply services to the International Space Station (ISS). Under the Commercial Orbital Transportation Services (COTS) program, Orbital ATK designed, acquired, built, and assembled these components: Antares, a medium-class launch vehicle; Cygnus, an advanced spacecraft using a Pressurized Cargo Module (PCM) provided by industrial partner Thales Alenia Space and a Service Module based on the Orbital GEOStar satellite bus.

== History ==
NG-16 was the fifth Cygnus mission under the Commercial Resupply Services-2 contract. Production and integration of Cygnus spacecraft are performed in Dulles, Virginia. The Cygnus service module is mated with the pressurized cargo module at the launch site, and mission operations are conducted from control centers in Dulles, Virginia and Houston, Texas.

== Spacecraft ==
This was the eleventh flight of the Enhanced Cygnus. Northrop Grumman named this spacecraft after Ellison Onizuka, the first Asian American astronaut.

== Manifest ==
The Cygnus spacecraft was loaded with 3,723 kg (8,208 lb) of research, hardware, and crew supplies.

- Crew supplies: 1,396 kg (3,078 lb)
- Unpressurized cargo: 48 kg (106 lb)
- Science investigations: 1,064 kg (2,346 lb)
- Spacewalk equipment: 15 kg (33 lb)
- Vehicle hardware: 1,037 kg (2,286 lb)
- Computer resources: 44 kg (97 lb)

The SEOPS Slingshot Deployment System delivered CubeSats to a 500 km (310 mi) orbit, following un-berthing from the ISS in late 2021.

The 4-Bed Carbon Dioxide Scrubber, a next-generation air filtration unit developed and built by NASA's Marshall Space Flight Center, was aboard Cygnus NG-16.

== Research ==
NASA Glenn Research Center:

- Flow Boiling and Condensation Experiment (FBCE)
- Fluids Integrated Rack (FIR) Reconfigure

University of Kentucky:

- Kentucky Re-Entry Probe Experiment (KREPE): This experiment consisted of three capsules that re-entered the atmosphere in a hypersonic flight. This experiment was conducted at the conclusion of the NG-16 flight. Each capsule was outfitted with a heat shield for protection during re-entry. The goal of the mission was to collect thermal data from each heat shield.

Space Development Agency:

- Prototype Infrared Payload (PIRPL): An experimental missile tracking infrared sensor made by Northrop Grumman for the Space Development Agency (SDA) and the Missile Defense Agency (MDA) in support of the SDA's planned Tracking Layer constellation. Before the re-entry into the atmosphere, Cygnus NG-16 released the PIRPL to conduct observations using its infrared sensor. The infrared data helped engineers design the next generation of missile-tracking satellites. The technology demonstration helped future U.S. military satellites better detect and track hypersonic missiles, like the ones China and Russia have recently (around 2021) tested.

== Undocking and departure ==
On 18 November 2021, SPDM/Dextre grappled STP-H6 from ExPRESS-3 and mounted it onto the external payload attach device on the hull. At 16:01 UTC on 20 November 2021, flight controllers on the ground sent commands to release the Northrop Grumman Cygnus spacecraft from the Canadarm2 robotic arm after earlier detaching Cygnus NG-16 from the Earth-facing port of the Unity module. At the time of release, the station was flying about 420 km (260 mi) over the South Pacific Ocean. The Cygnus spacecraft successfully departed the International Space Station more than three months after arriving at the space station to deliver about 3,400 kg (7,500 lb) of scientific investigations and supplies to the orbiting laboratory. After departure, the Kentucky Re-Entry Probe Experiment (KREPE) stowed inside Cygnus took measurements to demonstrate a thermal protection system for spacecraft and their contents during re-entry in Earth's atmosphere, which can be difficult to replicate in ground simulations. Cygnus deorbited on 15 December 2021, following a deorbit engine firing to set up a destructive re-entry in which the spacecraft, filled with waste the space station crew packed in the spacecraft, burns up in the atmosphere of Earth.

== See also ==
- Uncrewed spaceflights to the International Space Station
