= STS-51-C =

1985 American crewed spaceflight for the Department of Defense

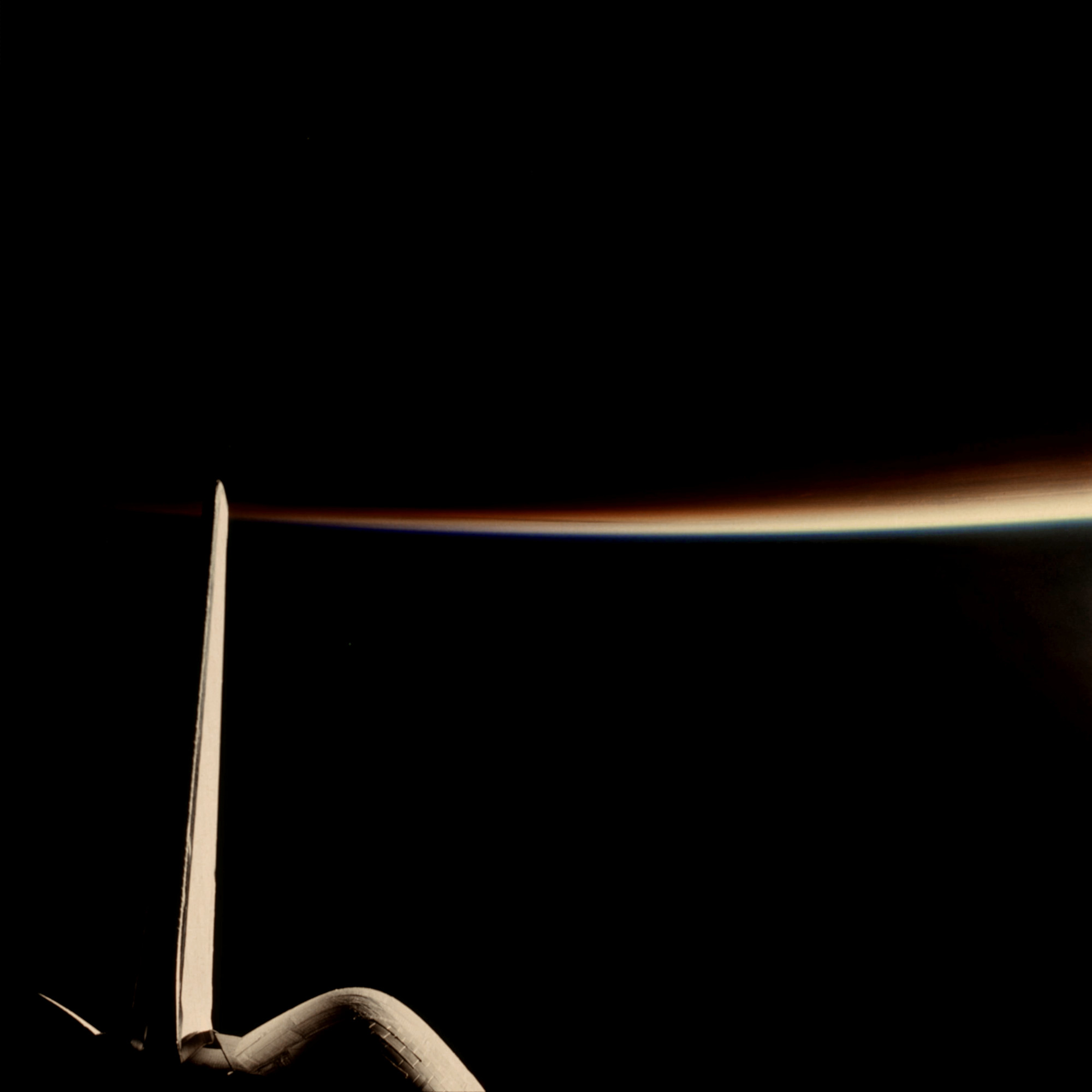
- Discovery in orbit; in-flight photography of the Department of Defense support mission is limited.
- Names: Space Transportation System-15
- Mission type: DoD satellite deployment
- Operator: NASA
- COSPAR ID: 1985-010A
- SATCAT no.: 15496
- Mission duration: 3 days, 1 hour, 33 minutes, 23 seconds
- Distance travelled: 2,010,000 km (1,250,000 mi)
- Orbits completed: 49

Spacecraft properties
- Spacecraft: Space Shuttle Discovery
- Launch mass: 113,802 kg (250,890 lb)
- Landing mass: (Classified)
- Payload mass: (Classified)

Crew
- Crew size: 5
- Members: Ken Mattingly; Loren Shriver; Ellison Onizuka; James Buchli; Gary Payton

Start of mission
- Launch date: January 24, 1985, 19:50:00 UTC (2:50 pm EST)
- Launch site: Kennedy, LC-39A
- Contractor: Rockwell International

End of mission
- Landing date: January 27, 1985, 21:23:23 UTC (4:23:23 am EST)
- Landing site: Kennedy, SLF Runway 15

Orbital parameters
- Reference system: Geocentric orbit
- Regime: Low Earth orbit
- Perigee altitude: 332 km (206 mi)
- Apogee altitude: 341 km (212 mi)
- Inclination: 28.45°
- Period: 91.30 minutes
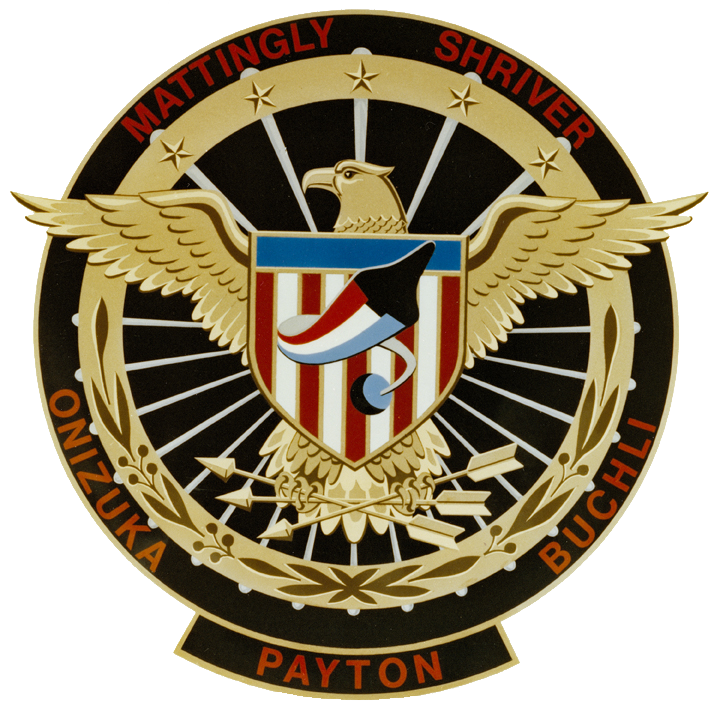
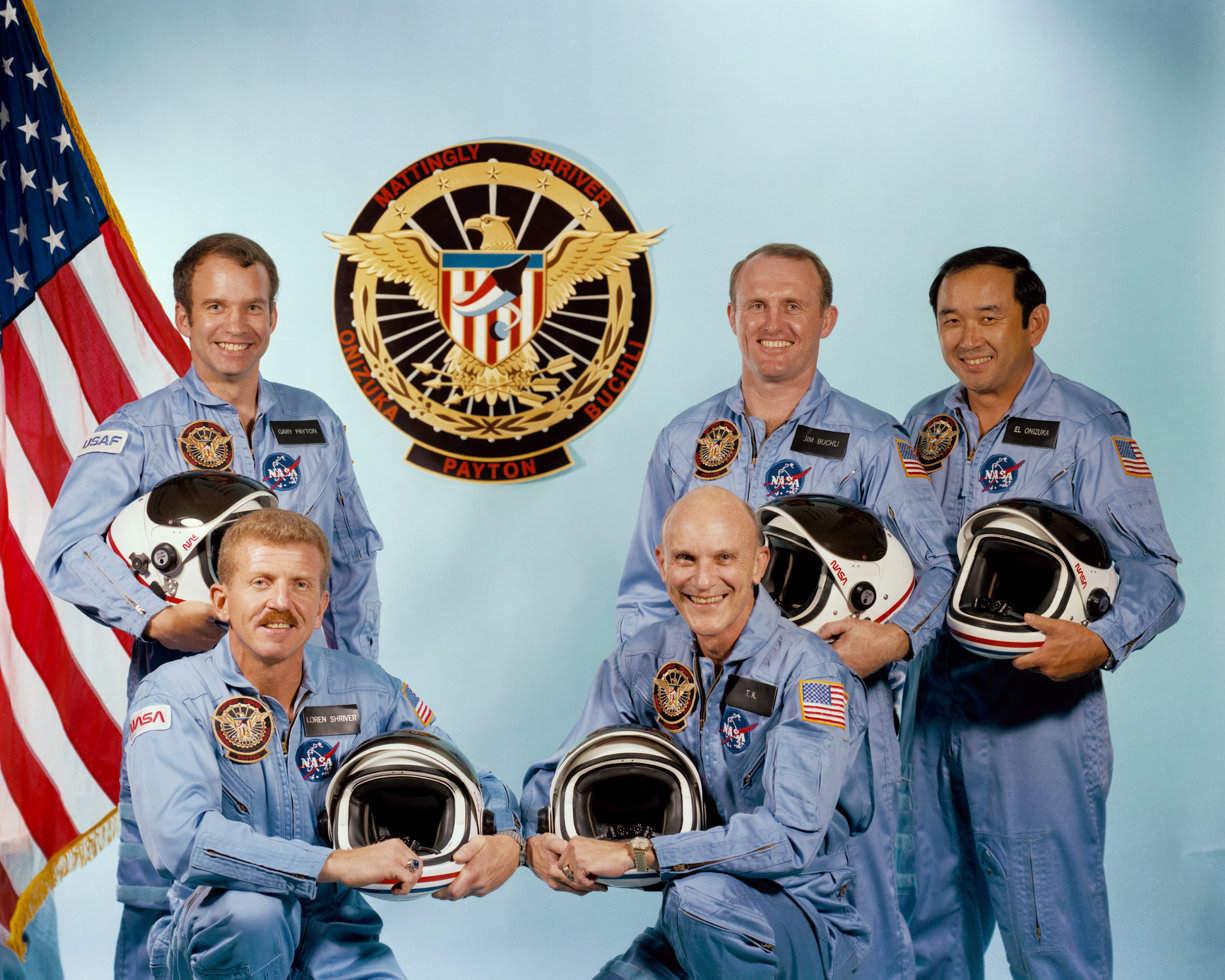
- STS-51-C mission patch Back row: Payton, Buchli and Onizuka; Front row: Shriver and Mattingly Space Shuttle program

STS-51-C (formerly STS-10) was the 15th flight of NASA's Space Shuttle program, and the third flight of Space Shuttle Discovery. It launched on January 24, 1985, and made the fourth shuttle landing at the Shuttle Landing Facility at the Kennedy Space Center in Florida on January 27, 1985. STS-51-C was the first shuttle mission dedicated to the United States Department of Defense (DoD), and consequently many details remain classified. NASA reported that a satellite (USA-8) was deployed during the mission using an Inertial Upper Stage booster and met mission objectives. At just over three days, the mission was shorter in duration than most civilian missions and was the shortest of Discovery's career.

== Crew ==
Position	Astronaut
Commander	Ken Mattingly; Third and last spaceflight
Pilot	Loren Shriver; First spaceflight
Mission Specialist 1	Ellison Onizuka; First space mission Only spaceflight
Mission Specialist 2 Flight Engineer	James Buchli; First spaceflight
Payload Specialist 1	Gary Payton, MSE; Only spaceflight

=== Backup crew ===
Position	Astronaut
Payload Specialist 1	Keith Wright, MSE

=== Crew seat assignments ===
Seat	Launch	Landing	Seats 1–4 are on the flight deck. Seats 5–7 are on the mid-deck.
1	Mattingly		Seats 1–4 are on the flight deck. Seats 5–7 are on the mid-deck.
2	Shriver		Seats 1–4 are on the flight deck. Seats 5–7 are on the mid-deck.
3	Onizuka		Seats 1–4 are on the flight deck. Seats 5–7 are on the mid-deck.
4	Buchli		Seats 1–4 are on the flight deck. Seats 5–7 are on the mid-deck.
5	Payton		Seats 1–4 are on the flight deck. Seats 5–7 are on the mid-deck.
6	Unused		Seats 1–4 are on the flight deck. Seats 5–7 are on the mid-deck.
7	Unused		Seats 1–4 are on the flight deck. Seats 5–7 are on the mid-deck.

== Mission summary ==
Attempt	Planned	Result	Turnaround	Reason	Decision point	Weather go (%)	Notes
1	23 Jan 1985, 1:15:00 pm	Scrubbed	—	Weather	22 Jan 1985, 12:00 am		Concerns about ice formation on the vehicle due to cold weather. Due to the classified nature of the mission, NASA only announced the exact launch time nine minutes before liftoff, with 1:15 PM being the earliest according to one source.
2	24 Jan 1985, 2:50:00 pm	Success	1 day 1 hour 35 minutes				

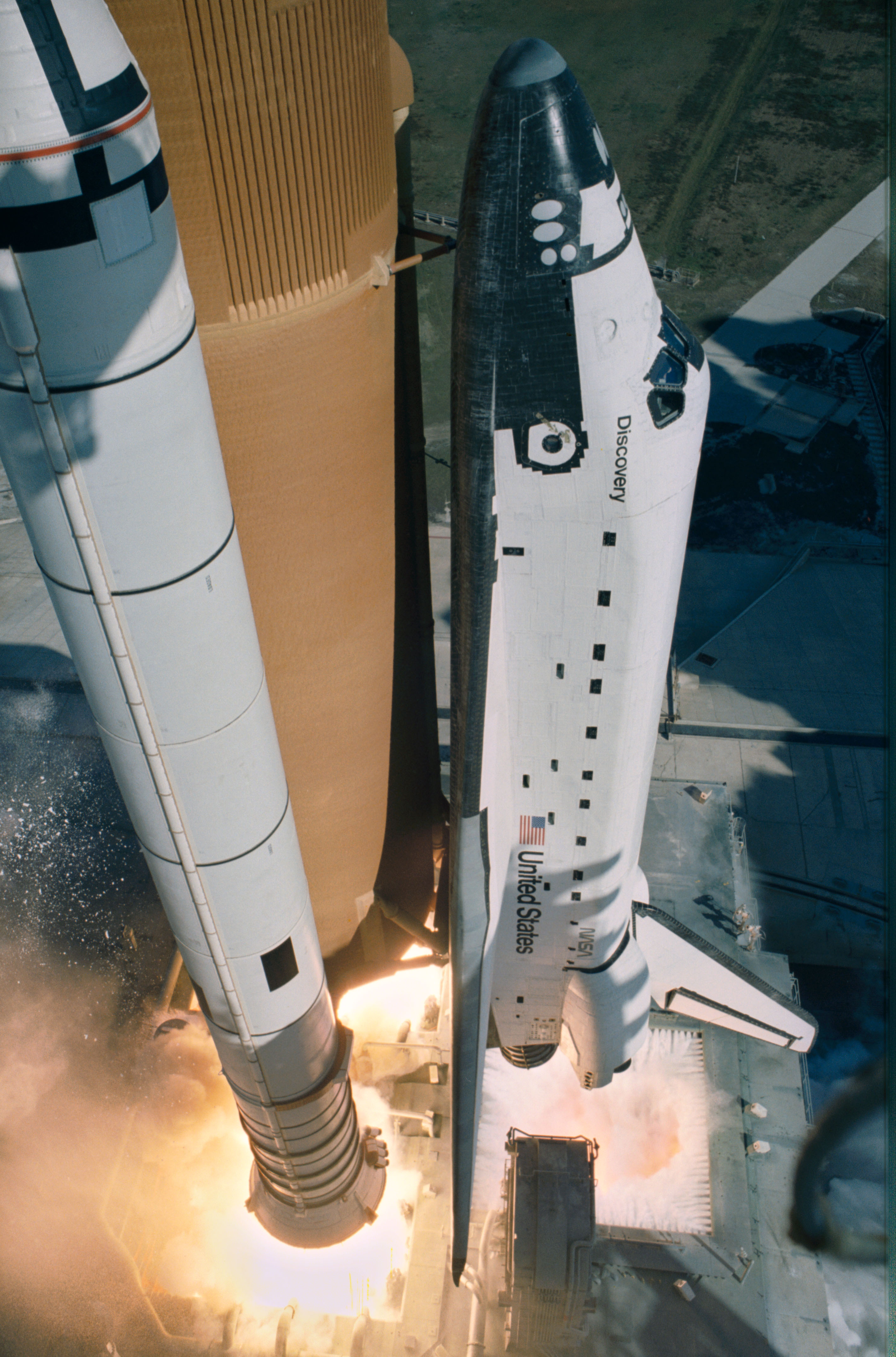
Launch of STS-51-C as seen from an IMAX camera attached to the Fixed Service Structure

STS-51-C launched from Kennedy Space Center (KSC) on January 24, 1985, at 19:50:00 UTC, and was the first of nine shuttle missions in 1985. It was originally scheduled for January 23, 1985, but was delayed because of freezing weather. Challenger had been scheduled for this flight, but Discovery was substituted when problems were encountered with Challenger's thermal protection tiles. STS-51-C marked the 100th human spaceflight to achieve orbit.

The mission's length of three days was shorter than the week or longer of most civilian shuttle flights. It was the first dedicated to the U.S. Department of Defense (DoD), and most information about it remains classified. For the first time, NASA did not provide pre-launch commentary to the public until nine minutes before liftoff. The U.S. Air Force only stated that the shuttle successfully launched its payload with an Inertial Upper Stage (IUS) on the mission's seventh orbit. It is believed that the payload was a Magnum SIGINT satellite into geosynchronous orbit. Other DoD flights STS-33 and STS-38 could have carried similar payloads. Payton stated in 2009 that STS-51-C's payload is "still up there, and still operating". Payton was a USAF Manned Spaceflight Engineer (MSE); the USAF declined a NASA offer to fly another MSE on the mission.

Also, according to Aviation Week, the shuttle initially entered a 204 × 519 km (127 × 322 mi) orbit, at an inclination of 28.45° to the equator. It then executed three Orbital Maneuvering System (OMS) burns, the last being executed on the fourth orbit. The first burn was conducted to circularize the shuttle's orbit at 519 km (322 mi).

The mission lasted 3 days, 1 hour, 33 minutes, and 23 seconds. Discovery touched down on SLF Runway 15 at KSC on January 27, 1985, at 21:23:23 UTC. IMAX footage of the STS-51-C launch was used in the 1985 movie The Dream is Alive.

== Mission insignia ==
The crew insignia for STS Flight 51-C includes the names of its five crewmembers. The STS 51-C mission marked the third trip of the Space Shuttle Discovery into space, which is referenced by the three colored trailing strips behind the orbiter in the United States red, white and blue. It was the first Space Shuttle mission totally dedicated to the U.S. Department of Defense, hence the DoD central eagle on the mission patch. The five stars on the upper part of the golden band of the DoD insignia represent the five astronauts. As this mission was classified, the patch includes no further detail as to the mission's payload or nature. For similar reasons, the name of the used orbiter was omitted from the patch.

== Connection to the Challenger disaster ==
Almost exactly a year after STS-51-C, Space Shuttle Challenger was destroyed with all hands on board during the STS-51-L mission including Ellison Onizuka, a crew member on both flights. As part of the investigation into the disaster, it was reported to the Rogers Commission that during the launch of STS-51-C, the worst Space Shuttle Solid Rocket Booster (SRB) blow-by effects of any mission prior to STS-51-L occurred, indicating conclusively that the Viton O-rings were not sufficiently sealing the hot gases inside the combustion chambers of the SRBs while firing. After they were recovered post-flight, the O-rings in both the right and left SRBs showed some degree of charring, but analysis of the center field joint of the right SRB showed an unprecedented penetration of the primary O-ring and heavy charring on the secondary O-ring.

This information is significant to the established consensus that low air temperature was a major factor in Challenger's destruction because the temperature at STS-51-C's launch was also, up to its time, the coldest recorded during a shuttle launch, at only 12 °C (54 °F).

== See also ==
- List of human spaceflights
- List of Space Shuttle missions
- Militarization of space
