= Kathryn C. Thornton =

American scientist and astronaut (born 1952)

Kathryn Thornton
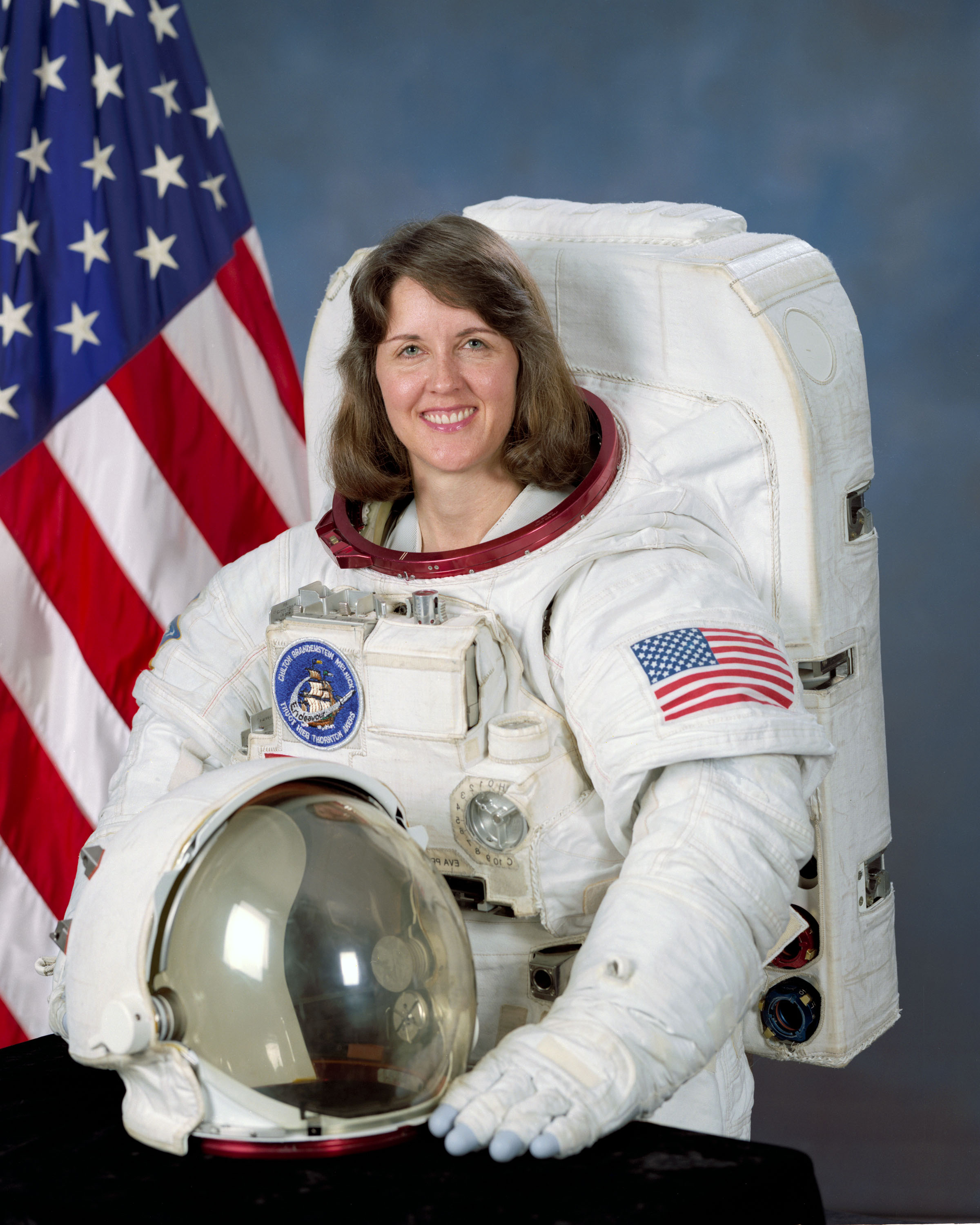
- Thornton in 1992
- Born: 17 August 1952 (age 74); Montgomery, Alabama, U.S.
- Education: Auburn University (BS); University of Virginia (MS, PhD)
- Spouse: Stephen Thornton
- Space career

NASA astronaut
- Time in space: 40d 15h 14m
- Selection: NASA Group 10 (1984)
- Total EVAs: 3
- Total EVA time: 21h, 11m
- Missions: STS-33; STS-49; STS-61; STS-73

Kathryn Ryan Cordell Thornton (born 17 August, 1952) is an American scientist and a former NASA astronaut with over 975 hours in space, including 21 hours of extravehicular activity. She was the associate dean for graduate programs at the University of Virginia School of Engineering and Applied Science, as well as a professor of mechanical and aerospace engineering before her retirement in 2019. She is now Professor Emerita.

Thornton was inducted in the United States Astronaut Hall of Fame in 2010.

== Education and organizations ==
Kathyrn Thornton graduated from Sidney Lanier High School in Montgomery, Alabama in 1970. She later received a Bachelor of Science degree in physics at Auburn University in 1974. In 1977, she received an Master of Science degree in physics. In 1979, she earned a Doctor of Philosophy degree in physics at the University of Virginia.

== Career ==
=== Physicist ===
After Thornton earned her doctoral degree at the University of Virginia in 1979, she was awarded a NATO Postdoctoral Fellowship to continue her research at the Max Planck Institute for Nuclear Physics in Heidelberg, Germany.

In 1980, Thornton became a physicist at the United States Army Foreign Science and Technology Center in Charlottesville, Virginia.

=== NASA ===
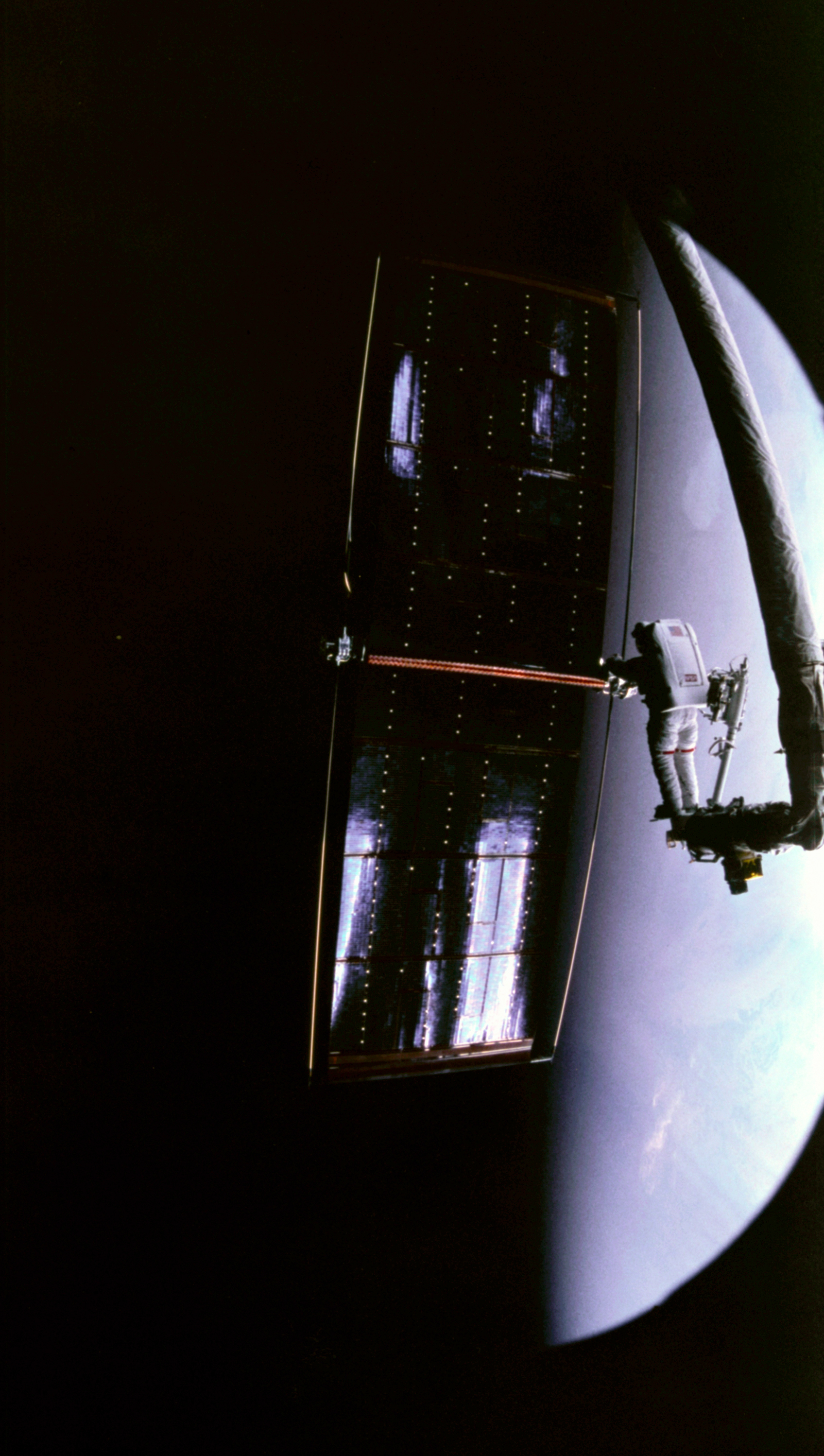
Thornton prepares to release a Hubble solar array during STS-61.

Selected by NASA in May 1984, Thornton became an astronaut in July 1985. Her technical assignments have included flight software verification in the Shuttle Avionics Integration Laboratory (SAIL), serving as a team member of the Vehicle Integration Test Team (VITT) at Kennedy Space Center, and as a spacecraft communicator (CAPCOM). A veteran of four space flights, Thornton flew on STS-33 in 1989, STS-49 in 1992, STS-61 in 1993, and STS-73 in 1995. She has logged over 975 hours in space, including more than 21 hours of extravehicular activity (EVA).

Thornton was a mission specialist on the crew of STS-33 which launched at night from Kennedy Space Center, Florida, on November 22, 1989, aboard the Space Shuttle Discovery. The mission carried Department of Defense payloads and other secondary payloads. After 79 orbits of the Earth, this five-day mission concluded on November 27, 1989, at Edwards Air Force Base, California.

On her second flight, Thornton served on the crew of STS-49, May 7 – 16, 1992, on board the maiden flight of the new Space Shuttle Endeavour. During the mission the crew conducted the initial test flight of Endeavour, performed a record four EVA's (spacewalks) to retrieve, repair and deploy the International Telecommunications Satellite (Intelsat), and to demonstrate and evaluate numerous EVA tasks to be used for the assembly of Space Station Freedom. Thornton was one of two EVA crew members who evaluated Space Station assembly techniques on the fourth EVA. STS-49 logged 213 hours in space and 141 Earth orbits prior to landing at Edwards Air Force Base, California.

On her third flight, Thornton was a mission specialist EVA crew member aboard the Space Shuttle Endeavour on the STS-61 Hubble Space Telescope (HST) servicing and repair mission. STS-61 launched at night from the Kennedy Space Center, Florida, on December 2, 1993. During the 11-day flight, the HST was captured and restored to full capacity through a record five spacewalks by four astronauts, including Thornton. After having traveled 4,433,772 miles in 163 orbits of the Earth, the crew of Endeavour returned to a night landing at the Kennedy Space Center on December 13, 1993. Then, after Expedition 14, Sunita Williams surpassed her for woman with the most spacewalks.

From October 20 to November 5, 1995, Thornton served aboard Space Shuttle Columbia on STS-73, as the payload commander of the second United States Microgravity Laboratory mission. The mission focused on materials science, biotechnology, combustion science, the physics of fluids, and numerous scientific experiments housed in the pressurized Spacelab module. In completing her fourth space flight, Thornton orbited the Earth 256 times, traveled over 6 million miles, and logged a total of 15 days, 21 hours, 52 minutes and 21 seconds in space.

Thornton left NASA on August 1, 1996.

She was inducted into the 2010 class of the U.S. Astronaut Hall of Fame.

=== Leadership ===
Thornton is a Director Emeritus of the Space Foundation’s Board of Directors, having joined the organization in 2010 and serving in various capacities, including as Chairwoman from 2020 to 2022.

In November 2020, Thornton appeared at WomenTech Network's Women in Tech Global Awards. During her appearance, she shared her experiences as a scientist and astronaut, aiming to support and inspire women in the technology sector.

== Personal life ==
Thornton is married to Stephen T. Thornton from Oak Ridge, Tennessee. She has two stepsons and three daughters. On October 16, 2019, Thornton completed a through-hike of the Appalachian Trail.
