= Gary Payton (astronaut) =

American astronaut (born 1948)

Gary E. Payton
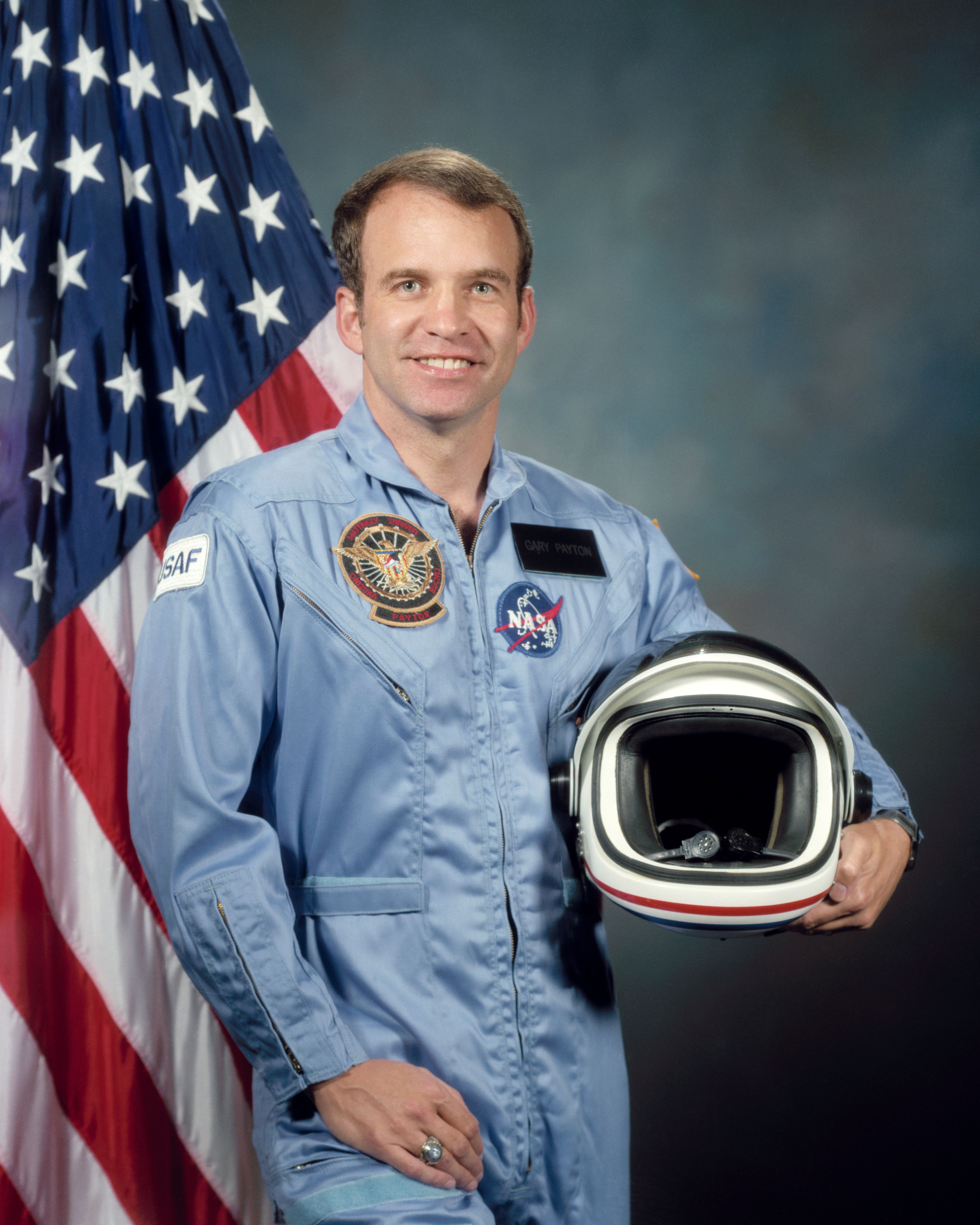
- Born: June 20, 1948 (age 78); Rock Island, Illinois, U.S.
- Other name: Gary Eugene Payton
- Education: Bradley University; USAFA, B.S. 1971; Purdue University, M.S. 1972
- Occupation: Pilot
- Space career

USAF astronaut
- Status: Retired
- Rank: Colonel, USAF
- Time in space: 3d 01h 33m
- Selection: 1979 USAF Group
- Missions: STS-51-C

Colonel Gary Eugene Payton, USAF, (born June 20, 1948) is an American astronaut and USAF Manned Spaceflight Engineer. Payton flew on the STS-51-C mission aboard the Space Shuttle Discovery in January 1985. He later served as Deputy Undersecretary of the Air Force under the Bush and Obama Administrations.

== Education ==
Payton graduated from high school in Rock Island, Illinois, in 1966. He went on to attend Bradley University, in Peoria, Illinois. After one year at Bradley, he entered the United States Air Force Academy, in Colorado Springs, Colorado, graduating with a Bachelor of Science degree in astronautical engineering in 1971. He continued with his graduate education at Purdue University School of Aeronautics and Astronautics, in West Lafayette, Indiana, earning a Master of Science degree in astronautical and aeronautical engineering in 1972. He graduated from pilot training at Craig AFB, in Alabama in 1973.

== Career ==
From 1972 to 1976, Payton served as a U.S. Air Force pilot and instructor pilot, Craig AFB, Alabama. He has accumulated at least 1,080 hours in T-37, T-38, and T-39 aircraft.

Payton served as a spacecraft test controller from 1976 to 1980, at Cape Canaveral Air Force Station, in Florida. He was selected for the USAF Manned Spaceflight Engineer Program in February 1980.

Payton flew on the STS-51-C mission aboard the Space Shuttle Discovery in January 1985 which launched and returned to land at the Kennedy Space Center, in Florida. STS-51C was the first dedicated Space Shuttle Department of Defense mission. The mission carried an Inertial Upper Stage and deployed a DoD satellite. This was the first shuttle mission that most on-orbit details were classified and not publicized. Payton traveled over 1.2 million miles in 48 Earth orbits, and logged more than 73 hours in space.

From 1997 to 2000, Payton also served as NASA's Deputy Associate Administrator for Space Transportation Technology where he initiated, planned and led the Reusable Launch Vehicle technology demonstration program, which included the X-33, X-34, X-37 and DC-XA flight test projects. Prior to this, he was the Director of NASA's Space Transportation Division from 1995 to 1997.

After leaving NASA, Payton joined the ORBIMAGE as its Vice President for Engineering and Operations.

Payton was Deputy Under Secretary of the Air Force for Space Programs from 2005 to 2010. Prior to this, he served as Deputy for Advanced Systems, Missile Defense Agency from 2002 to 2005.

He is currently distinguished visiting professor in the Schriever Chair in Astronautics at the United States Air Force Academy, teaching astronautical engineering.

== Personal life ==
Gary Payton is married to Sue Payton and they have a daughter.
