= Gregory Jarvis =

American engineer and astronaut (1944–1986)

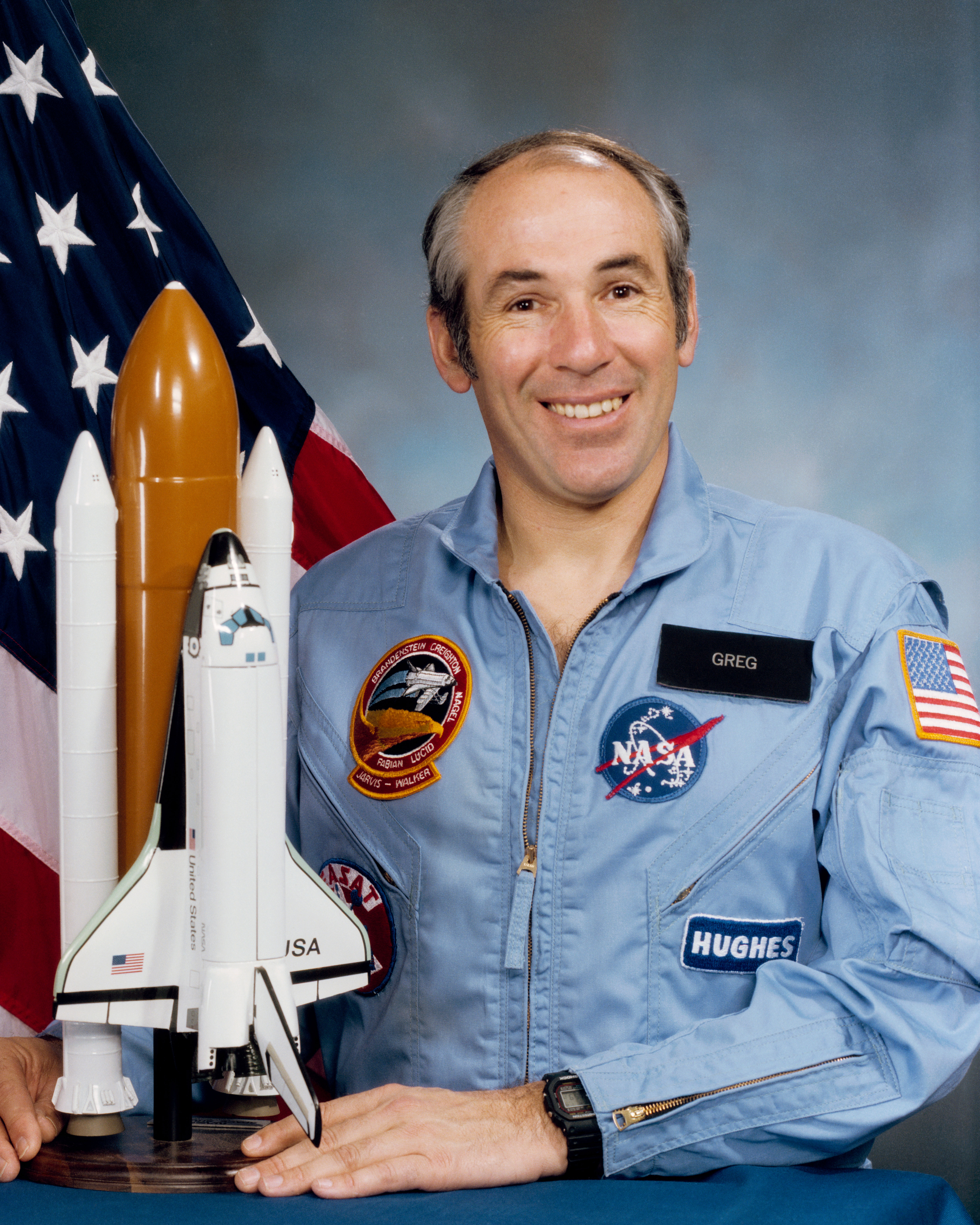
- Jarvis in 1985
- Born: Gregory Bruce Jarvis; August 24, 1944; Detroit, Michigan, U.S.
- Died: January 28, 1986 (aged 41); North Atlantic Ocean
- Cause of death: Space Shuttle Challenger disaster
- Education: University at Buffalo (BS); Northeastern University (MS); West Coast University
- Awards: Congressional Space Medal of Honor
- Space career

Hughes Aircraft payload specialist
- Rank: Captain, USAF
- Mission: STS-51-L

Gregory Bruce Jarvis (August 24, 1944 – January 28, 1986) was an American engineer and astronaut who died during the destruction of the Space Shuttle Challenger on mission STS-51-L, where he was serving as payload specialist for Hughes Aircraft.

== Education ==
Jarvis graduated from Mohawk Central High School (later renamed to Gregory B. Jarvis High School, which eventually became the Gregory B. Jarvis Middle School in his honor), in Mohawk, New York, in 1962. He received a Bachelor of Science degree in electrical engineering from the State University of New York at Buffalo five years later, and a Master of Science degree in the same discipline from Northeastern University in 1969.

Jarvis joined the United States Air Force the same year and served until 1973, when he was honorably discharged as a Captain. Thereafter, Jarvis worked for Hughes Aircraft.

== Space Shuttle Challenger disaster ==
In June 1984, Jarvis was one of two Hughes Aircraft employees selected as candidates for the Space Shuttle program. He planned to conduct experiments regarding the effects of weightlessness on fluids. Jarvis was initially scheduled to make his shuttle flight in April 1985, but Jarvis was replaced on that flight by U.S. senator Jake Garn. Jarvis' flight was rescheduled for early January 1986, but he was again replaced – this time by U.S. representative Bill Nelson.

Jarvis was Payload Specialist 2 on STS-51-L which was launched from the Kennedy Space Center, Florida, at 11:38:00 EST on January 28, 1986. The crew on board the Orbiter Challenger included Commander Dick Scobee, pilot Michael J. Smith (USN), mission specialists Dr. Ronald McNair, Lt. Col. Ellison Onizuka (USAF), Dr. Judith Resnik, and fellow civilian payload specialist Christa McAuliffe. The entire STS-51-L crew died when Challenger broke apart during launch.

The remains of all seven astronauts from the Challenger disaster were discovered in the crew decks on the ocean floor. Jarvis' body was discovered in the lower mid-deck along with McNair and McAuliffe. During salvage operations to raise the crew deck from the ocean floor, Jarvis' body escaped from the wreckage, floated to the surface, and disappeared back into the sea. On April 15, 1986, on the last scheduled attempt to recover wreckage, his body was rediscovered and returned to shore. Jarvis was cremated and his ashes scattered in the Pacific Ocean.

== Awards and honors ==
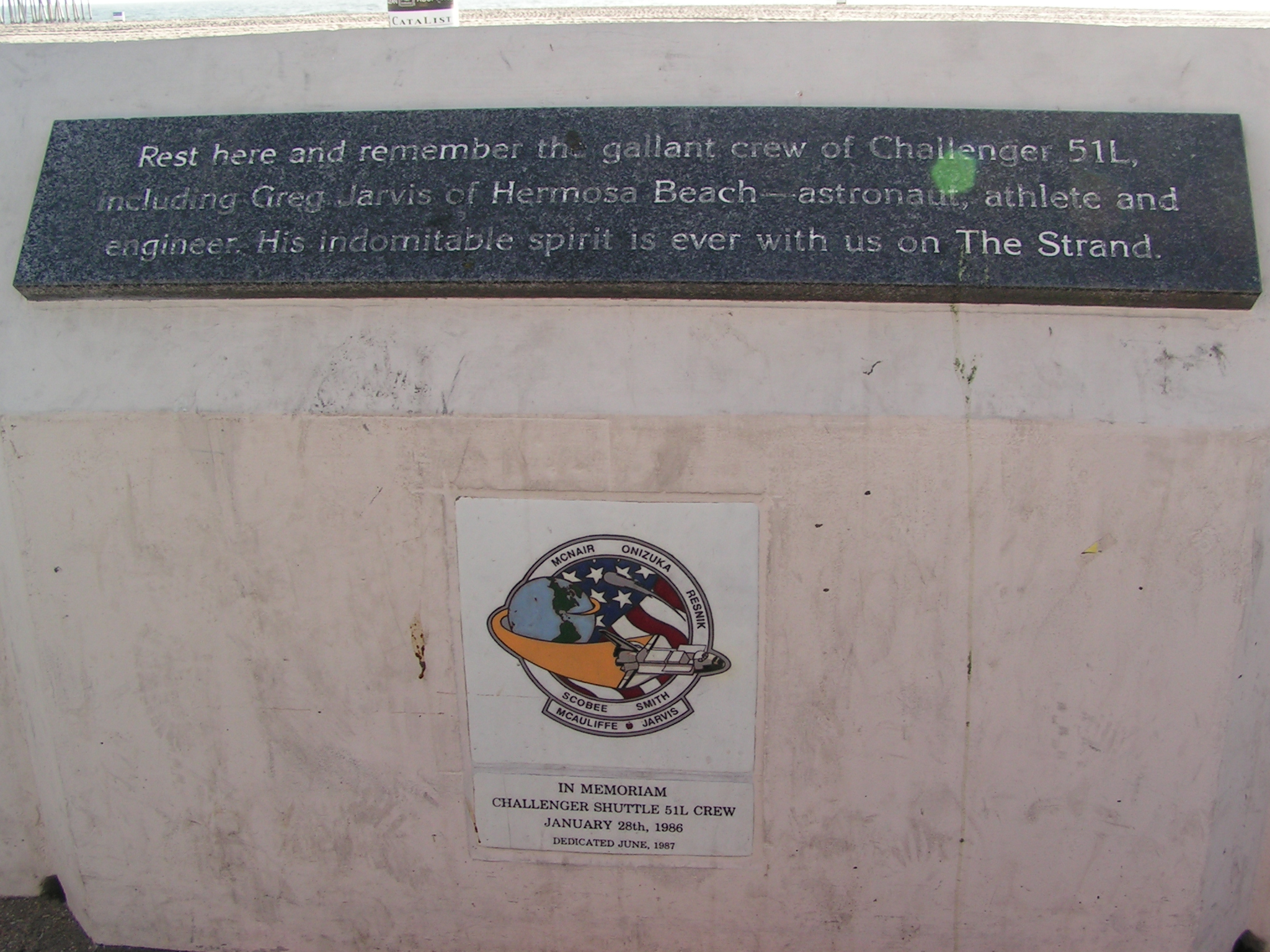
Memorial at Hermosa Beach

The East Engineering building on University at Buffalo (SUNY) north campus was renamed Jarvis Hall after Jarvis' death. In Spring 1986, when the university had not yet named the building in his memory, four students scaled the side of the building and nailed a sign with the name "Jarvis Hall" onto the side of the building as a show of support for the deceased astronaut. The four students were Space Mann, Little Jeffrey Brenner, Keith "Vedge" Tannenbaum and Joseph "Sneetch" Kuperberg. In 1987, the name was made official with a dedication ceremony. Jarvis Hall is devoted largely to Aerospace Engineering and engineering support services.

The hydropower-producing dam on Hinckley Lake, New York, operated by the New York Power Authority, was named the Gregory B. Jarvis Dam upon opening in June 1986.

In 1986, Mohawk Central High School in Mohawk, New York was renamed Gregory B. Jarvis Jr/Sr High School. It is now the Gregory B. Jarvis Middle School of the Central Valley Central School District.

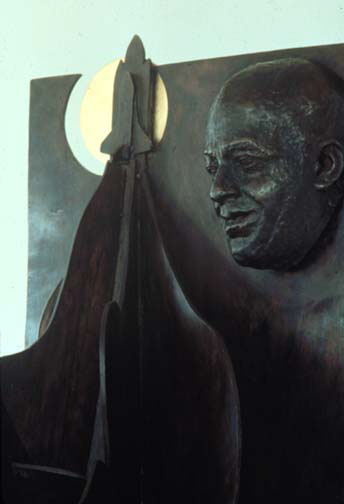
Detail of "Jarvis Memorial" sculpture by Tony Paterson

A sculpture by SUNY at Buffalo faculty member emeritus Tony Paterson entitled "Jarvis Memorial" was commissioned by SUNY at Buffalo to honor Jarvis and is currently in the SUNY at Buffalo art collection.

In 1988, a crater on Earth's moon was named for Jarvis.

Jarvis was portrayed by Richard Jenkins in the 1990 TV movie Challenger.

In 2004, Jarvis was posthumously awarded the Congressional Space Medal of Honor.

== See also ==
- List of human spaceflights
- List of Space Shuttle missions
- List of Space Shuttle crews
