= Challenger (1990 film) =

1990 film directed by Glenn Jordan

- DVD release cover
- Genre: Disaster docudrama
- Written by: George Englund
- Directed by: Glenn Jordan
- Starring: Karen Allen; Barry Bostwick; Richard Jenkins; Joe Morton; Keone Young; Brian Kerwin; Julie Fulton; Kale Browne; Kristin Bond; Angela Bassett
- Composer: David E. Kole
- Country of origin: United States
- Original language: English

Production
- Producers: George Englund; Courtney Pledger; Debbie Robins
- Production locations: Houston, Texas
- Cinematography: Newton Thomas Sigel
- Editor: Paul Rubell
- Running time: 135 minutes
- Production companies: King Phoenix Entertainment; The IndieProd Company

Original release
- Network: ABC
- Release: February 25, 1990

Challenger is a 1990 American disaster drama television film based on the events surrounding the Space Shuttle Challenger disaster in 1986. Its production was somewhat controversial as the families of the astronauts generally objected to it. A prologue states that the film was "researched with the consultation of the National Aeronauts and Space Administration" and partly filmed at NASA's Johnson Space Center in Houston, Texas.

== Plot ==
The film concentrates on the safety inspections and arguments surrounding the O-rings that ultimately were blamed for the explosion of Challenger. While doing this, it also aims to show the personal humanity of the seven crew members. Generally, the film supports the Space Shuttle program and the dedication of NASA personnel in general while criticizing NASA management.

After beginning on the eve of the launch, the rest of the film is told through flashback, beginning on July 19, 1985, when Christa McAuliffe was officially selected to be the first teacher to travel into space. The film ends just as the shuttle takes off on January 28, 1986, following a symbolic scene of each of the seven crew members and passengers reciting in their thoughts John Gillespie Magee Jr.'s poem "High Flight". U.S. President Ronald Reagan used part of "High Flight" in a speech written by Peggy Noonan on the night after the Challenger disaster while eulogizing the fallen members of the crew.

== Cast ==
Karen Allen portrayed Christa McAuliffe, Kristin Bond portrayed McAuliffe's daughter, Caroline, and Kale Browne portrayed McAuliffe's husband, Steven. Allen and Browne were married in real life.

Peter Boyle portrayed Roger Boisjoly, the Thiokol engineer most vocal about the danger of launching at extremely low temperatures because of the risk that the O-ring seals in the shuttle's rocket boosters would fail at those temperatures.

The film also examines the personal lives of the other members of the crew - Barry Bostwick as Commander Dick Scobee, Brian Kerwin as Pilot Michael Smith, Joe Morton as Dr. Ronald McNair, Keone Young as Lt. Col. Ellison Onizuka, Richard Jenkins as Gregory B. Jarvis, Julie Fulton as Dr. Judith Resnik - and their families - Angela Bassett as Cheryl McNair, Elizabeth Kemp as Jane Smith, Jeanne Mori as Lorna Onizuka, Debbie Boily as Marcia Jarvis, Melinda Ann Austin as June Scobee, Melissa Chan as Janelle Onizuka, Gavin Luckett as Reggie McNair, Naoka Nakagawa as Darien Onizuka, Thomas Allen Jr. as Scott Smith - before they boarded Challenger.

== Emmy award ==
At the 42nd Primetime Emmy Awards in September 1990, Challenger won Outstanding Sound Editing for a Miniseries or a Special.

== See also ==
- The Challenger Disaster, 2013 film
- Challenger: The Final Flight, 2020 documentary miniseries
