= Auburn Airport =

Auburn Airport may refer to:

- Auburn Municipal Airport (California), in Auburn, California, United States (FAA: AUN)
- Auburn Municipal Airport (Washington), in Auburn, Washington, United States (FAA: S50)
- Auburn/Lewiston Municipal Airport in Auburn/Lewiston, Maine, United States (FAA: LEW)
- Auburn University Regional Airport in Auburn, Alabama, United States (FAA: AUO)
