= Timeline of the STS-51-L mission =

Detailed timeline of Space Shuttle Challenger mission

STS-51-L mission patch

The STS-51-L mission started with the ignition of Challenger's main engines until the remote destruction of the two Solid rocket boosters (SRBs), and includes a transcript of crew conversations from the cockpit voice recorder on board the orbiter. STS-51-L was the twenty-fifth flight in the American Space Shuttle program, and marked the first time a civilian had flown aboard the Space Shuttle. The mission used Space Shuttle Challenger, which lifted off from launch pad 39B (LC-39B) on January 28, 1986, from Kennedy Space Center, Florida. The mission ended in disaster following the destruction of Challenger 73 seconds after lift-off, because of the failure of an O-ring seals on Challenger's right solid rocket booster, which led to the rapid disintegration of the Space Shuttle stack from overwhelming aerodynamic pressures. The seven-member crew was killed when the crew compartment hit the Atlantic Ocean at 333 km/h (207 mph), after two and a half minutes of freefall.

== Summary timeline ==
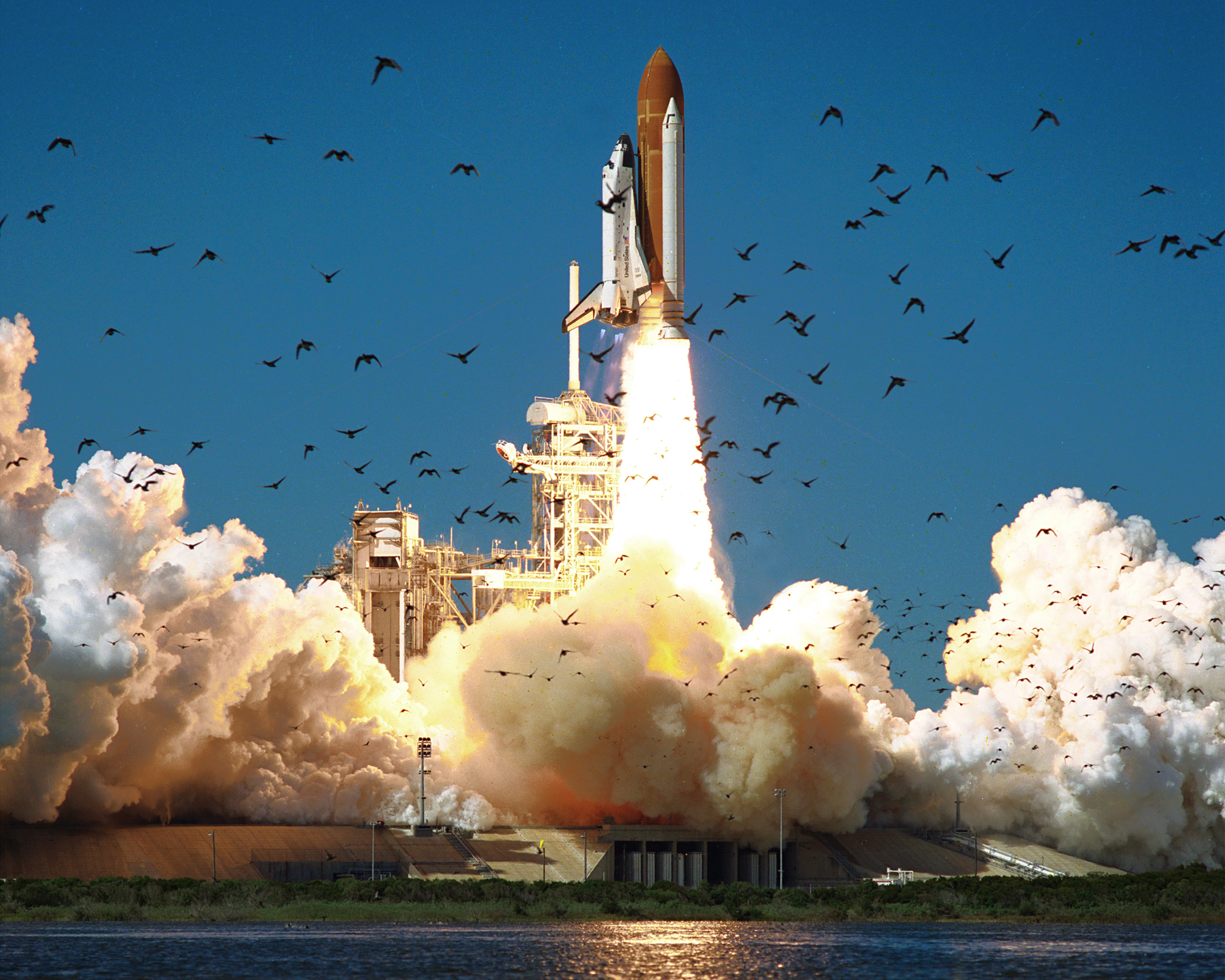
Space Shuttle Challenger lifts off on her final mission.

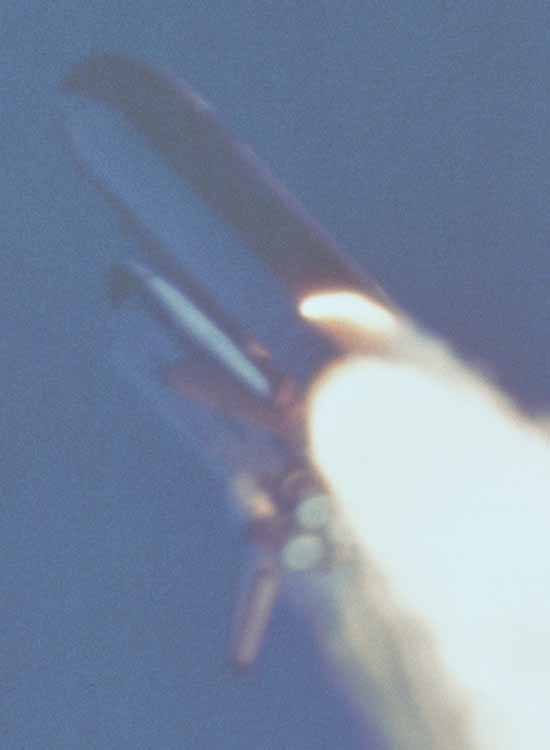
Cameras capture the plume of flame on Challenger's right-hand Solid rocket booster (SRB).

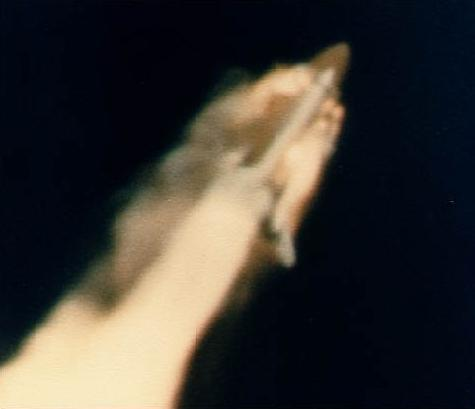
Challenger begins to disintegrate.

Following several days of lengthy delays, Challenger finally lifted off at 16:38:00 UTC on January 28, 1986. Her three main engines were ignited at T-6.6 seconds, and at T-0 the solid rocket boosters were ignited, lifting the shuttle stack off launchpad LC-39B at Kennedy Space Center. Almost immediately, cameras recording the launch registered the presence of smoke at the field joint next to the attachment strut on the right-hand SRB, indicating the failure of the O-rings that were supposed to seal the joint against the "blow-by" of hot gases from the boosters. However, sometime at around T+2 seconds, a piece of solid fuel from inside the booster moved inside the joint and provided a temporary seal against the blow-by, allowing the launch to proceed normally for around forty seconds.

However, at around T+36 seconds and an altitude of just over 3,000 m (9,800 ft), Challenger experienced the strongest wind shear ever felt during a Space Shuttle launch. The pitch and yaw commanded by the shuttle's computers in order to counter this wind caused the solid fuel plug to become dislodged from the field joint on the right SRB.

At around T+58 seconds, cameras noted the creation of a plume on the aft attachment strut on the right-hand SRB, as ignited gas began to force itself through a rapidly growing hole in the field joint. Within a second, the plume became well defined and intense. Internal pressure in the right SRB began to drop because of the rapidly enlarging hole in the failed joint, and at T+60 seconds there was visual evidence of flame coming through the joint and impinging on the external tank (ET). As the mission clock passed up through T+64 seconds, the plume suddenly changed shape, showing that it had burned a hole in the liquid hydrogen tank in Challenger's ET, causing the tank to leak. The pressure in the tank began to drop, and Challenger's onboard computers began to pivot the nozzles of the SSMEs to counter the now-unbalanced thrust between the two SRBs.

At this stage, the situation still seemed normal both to the astronauts and to flight controllers. At T+68, the CAPCOM informed the crew – "Challenger, go at throttle up", and Commander Francis R. "Dick" Scobee confirmed the call. His response, "Roger, go at throttle up", was the last communication from Challenger on the air-to-ground loop.

At around T+72 seconds, the right SRB apparently pulled away from the aft strut attaching it to the external tank. Later analysis of telemetry data showed a sudden lateral acceleration to the right at T+72.525 seconds, which may have been felt by the crew. The last statement captured by the crew cabin recorder came just half a second after this acceleration, when Pilot Michael J. Smith said, "Uh oh". Smith may also have been responding to onboard indications of main engine performance or to falling pressures in the external fuel tank.

At T+73.124 seconds, the aft dome of the liquid hydrogen tank failed, producing a propulsive force that pushed the hydrogen tank into the liquid oxygen tank in the forward part of the external tank. At the same time, the right SRB rotated about the forward attach strut, and struck the intertank structure.

The breakup of the vehicle began at T+73.162 seconds, at an altitude of 14,600 m (47,900 ft). With the external tank disintegrating, Challenger veered from its correct attitude with respect to the local air flow and was immediately torn apart by aerodynamic forces, resulting in a load factor of up to 20g – well over its design limit. The two SRBs, which could withstand greater aerodynamic loads, separated from the ET and continued in uncontrolled powered flight for another 37 seconds. The SRB casings were made of 12.7 mm (0.50 in) thick steel and were much stronger than the orbiter and ET; thus, both SRBs survived the breakup of the Space Shuttle stack, even though the right SRB was still suffering the effects of the joint burn-through that had set the destruction of Challenger in motion. The boosters were destroyed by the range safety system at around 110 seconds after launch.

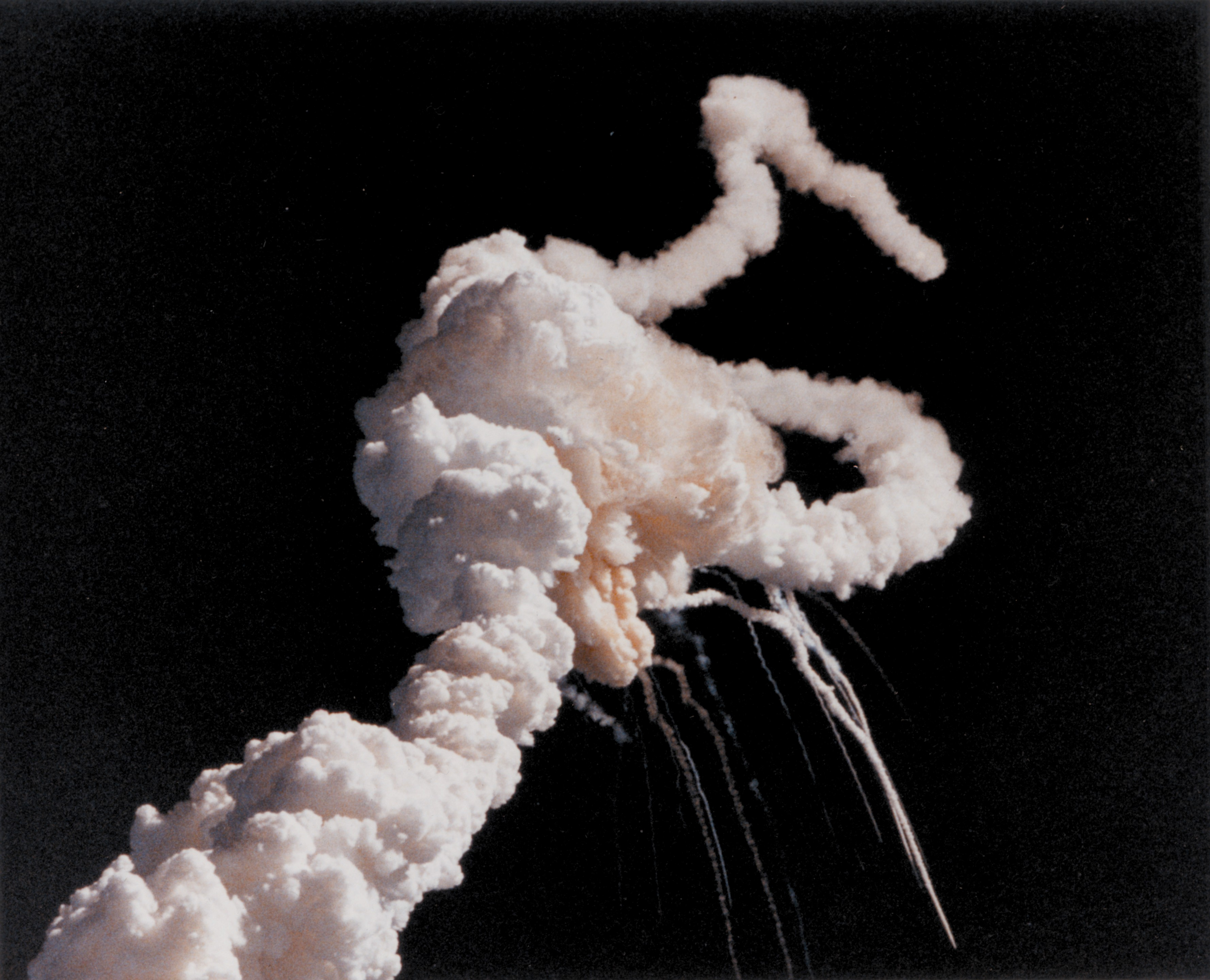
The Challenger fireball, following total disintegration of the shuttle stack.

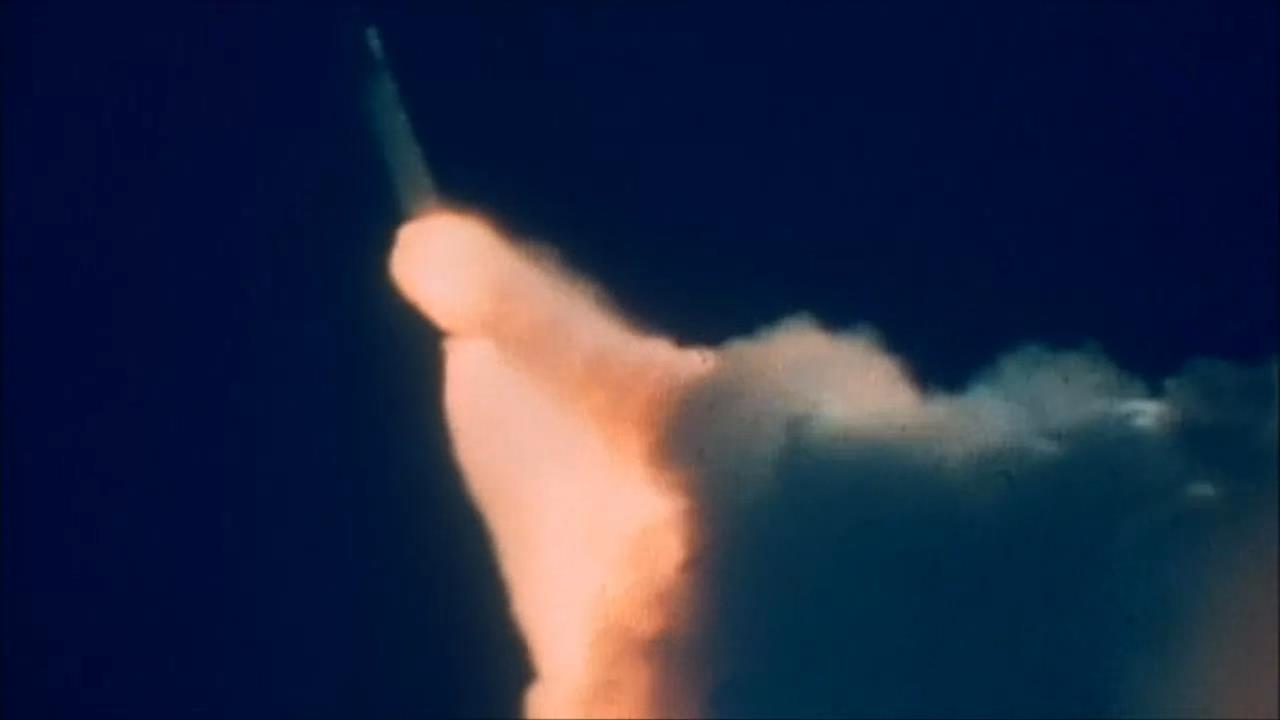
The right SRB exits the fireball. The anomalous plume that caused the disaster is clearly visible.

== Detailed timeline and transcript ==
The following timeline provides a detailed list of the major events of the launch of STS-51-L, culminating in the destruction of Challenger. The list also contains a transcript from the shuttle's Cockpit Voice Recorder (CVR), from ignition of the main engines to T+73 seconds. Acronyms used in the timeline are as follows:

- APU – Auxiliary Power Unit
- CAPCOM – Capsule Communicator (Richard O. Covey)
- CDR – Commander (Francis R. "Dick" Scobee)
- CVR – Cockpit Voice Recorder
- DPS - Data Processing Systems
- ET – External Tank
- FIDO – Flight Dynamics Officer
- GLS – Ground Launch Sequencer
- GPC – General Purpose Computer
- HPFT – High-Pressure Fuel Turbopump
- LH2 – Liquid Hydrogen
- LO2 – Liquid Oxygen (same as LOX)
- LVLH – Local Vertical Local Horizontal
- MCC – Mission Control Center
- MEC – Main Engine Controller
- MPS - Main Propulsion System
- MS1/MS2 – Mission Specialist (Ellison S. Onizuka/Judith A. Resnik)
- PAO – Public Affairs Officer
- PIC – Pyrotechnics Initiator Controller
- PLT – Pilot (Michael J. Smith)
- psf – pounds per square foot
- psi – pounds per square inch
- RCS – Reaction Control System
- SGTC – Shuttle to Ground Telemetry Channel
- SRB – Solid Rocket Booster
- SSME - Space Shuttle Main Engine
- TVC - Thrust Vector Control

Time (UTC) (h:min:s)	Mission Elapsed Time (MET) (s)	Event	Source
16:37:53.444	-6.566	SSME-3 ignition command.	GPC
16:37:53.564	-6.446	SSME-2 ignition command.	GPC
16:37:53.684	-6.326	SSME-1 ignition command.	GPC
16:37:54	-6	CDR: "There they go guys!" MS2: "All right!" CDR: "Three at a hundred."	CVR
16:38:00.010	0.000	SRB ignition command.	GPC
16:38:00.018	0.008	Holddown Post 2 PIC firing.	E8 camera
16:38:00	0	MS2: "Aall riight!"	CVR
16:38:00.260	0.250	First continuous vertical motion.	E9 camera
The O-rings fail in the right-hand SRB field joint.
16:38:00.688	0.678	First confirmed puff of smoke appears above SRB/ET attachment ring field joint on right-hand SRB.	E60 camera
16:38:00.846	0.836	Eight puffs of smoke appear above field joint, lasting from T+0.836 to T+2.5 seconds MET.	E63 camera
16:38:00.900	0.890	Ground launch sequence computers begin post-liftoff "safing" of launch pad structures and equipment.	GLS
16:38:01	1	PLT: "Here we go."	CVR
16:38:02.743	2.733	Last evidence of smoke from field joint.	CZR-1 camera
16:38:03	3	PAO: "Liftoff of the 25th space shuttle mission, and it has cleared the tower."	NASA TV
A solid-fuel 'plug' seals the gap formed by the O-ring "blow-by".
16:38:03.385	3.375	Last evidence of smoke.	E60 camera
16:38:04.349	4.339	SSMEs throttled up to 104%	SGTC
16:38:05	5	DPS: "Liftoff confirmed." Flight Director: "Liftoff..."	MCC
16:38:05.684	5.674	Right-hand SRB pressure 11.8 psi above normal.	SGTC
16:38:07	7	CDR: "Houston, Challenger – Roll program."	CVR
16:38:07.734	7.724	Roll program initiated.	SGTC
16:38:10	10	CAPCOM: "Roger roll, Challenger." FIDO: "Good roll, flight." Flight Director: "Rog, good roll."	MCC
16:38:11	11	PLT: "Go you Mother!"	CVR
16:38:14	14	MS1: "LVLH"	CVR
16:38:15	15	MS2: "(Expletive) hot!" CDR: "OK."	CVR
16:38:16	16	PAO: "Good roll program confirmed. Challenger now heading downrange."	NASA TV
16:38:19	19	PLT: "Looks like we've got a lotta wind here today."	CVR
16:38:19.869	19.859	SSMEs throttled back to 94%	SGTC
16:38:20	20	CDR: "Yeah."	CVR
16:38:21.134	21.124	Roll program completed.	SGTC
16:38:22	22	CDR: "It's a little hard to see out my window here."	CVR
16:38:27	27	BOOSTER: "Throttle down to 94." Flight Director: "Ninety four..."	MCC
16:38:28	28	PLT: "There's ten thousand feet and Mach point five."	CVR
16:38:28	28	PAO: "Engines beginning throttling down, now at 94%. Normal throttle for most of the flight is 104%. We'll throttle down to 65% shortly."	NASA TV
16:38:30	30	[Garble]	CVR
16:38:35	35	CDR: "Point nine."	CVR
16:38:35.389	35.379	SSMEs throttled back to 65%.	SGTC
16:38:37.000	36.990	Roll and Yaw Attitude Response to wind shear (36.990 to 62.990 seconds).	SGTC
The solid fuel 'plug' is dislodged.
16:38:40	40	PLT: "There's Mach one."	CVR
16:38:41	41	CDR: "Going through nineteen thousand."	CVR
16:38:43	43	CDR: "OK, we're throttling down."	CVR
16:38:45.227	45.217	A flash is observed downstream of the shuttle's right wing.	
16:38:48.128	48.118	A second flash is seen trailing the right wing.	
16:38:48.428	48.418	A third unexplained flash is seen downstream of the shuttle's right-hand wing – a brilliant orange ball of flame appears to emerge from under the right wing and quickly merges with the plume of the solid rocket boosters, a phenomenon noted on previous flights.	70mm camera
16:38:49	49	BOOSTER: "Three at 65." PAO: "...Three good fuel cells. Three good APUs..." Flight Director: "Sixty-five, FIDO..." FIDO: "T-del confirms throttles." Flight Director: "...Thank you."	MCC and NASA TV
16:38:51.870	51.860	SSMEs throttled up to 104%	SGTC
16:38:52	52	PAO: "Velocity 2257 feet per second (1539 mph), altitude 4.3 nautical miles, downrange distance 3 nautical miles..."	NASA TV
16:38:57	57	CDR: "Throttling up."	CVR
16:38:58	58	PLT: "Throttle up."	CVR
16:38:58.798	58.788	First evidence of flame on right-hand SRB	E207 camera
16:38:59	59	CDR: "Roger."	CVR
16:38:59.010	59.000	Reconstructed Max Q (720 psf)	Best estimated trajectory
16:38:59.272	59.262	Continuous well-defined plume of flame on right-hand SRB	E207 camera
16:38:59.763	59.753	Flame from right-hand SRB in downwards direction (seen from south side of vehicle)	E204 camera
16:38:60	60	PLT: "Feel that mother go!" "Woooohoooo!"	CVR
16:39:00.014	60.238	Pressures in right- and left-hand SRBs begin to diverge.	B47P2302
16:39:00.248	60.238	First evidence of intermittent plume deflection	E207 camera
16:39:00.258	60.248	First evidence of SRB plume attaching to ET ring frame	E203 camera
16:39:00.998	60.988	First evidence of continuous plume deflection	E207 camera
16:39:01.734	61.724	Peak roll rate in response to wind shear	SGTC
16:39:02	62	PLT: "Thirty-five thousand going through one point five."	CVR
16:39:02.094	62.084	Peak TVC response to wind shear	SGTC
16:39:02.414	62.404	Peak yaw response to wind shear	SGTC
16:39:02.494	62.484	Right-hand outboard elevon actuator hinge moment spike	SGTC
16:39:03.934	63.924	RH outboard elevon actuator delta pressure change	SGTC
16:39:03.974	63.964	Start of planned pitch rate maneuver	SGTC
The plume of flame burns through the LH2 tank in the ET.
16:39:04.670	64.660	Change in anomalous plume shape (LH2 tank leak near 2058 ring frame)	E204 camera
16:39:04.715	64.705	Bright sustained glow on sides of ET	E204 camera
16:39:04.947	64.937	Start SSME gimbal angle large pitch variations	SGTC
16:39:05	65	CDR: "Reading four eighty six on mine."	CVR
16:39:05.174	65.164	Beginning of transient motion due to changes in aero forces due to plume	SGTC
16:39:06	66	BOOSTER: "Throttle up, three at 104." Flight Director: "CAPCOM, go at throttle up."	MCC
16:39:06.774	66.764	Start ET LH2 ullage pressure deviations	SGTC
16:39:07	67	PLT: "Yep, that's what I've got, too."	CVR
16:39:08	68	PAO: "Engines are throttling up. Three engines now at 104 percent." CAPCOM: "Challenger, go at throttle up."	NASA TV and MCC
16:39:10	70	CDR: "Roger, go at throttle up." (last transmission on air-to-ground voice loop)	CVR
The flame burns through the lower attachment strut on the right-hand SRB, causing the SRB to move away from the ET.
16:39:12.214	72.204	Left- and right-hand SRB yaw rates begin to diverge	SGTC
16:39:12.294	72.284	Left- and right-hand SRB pitch rates begin to diverge	SGTC
16:39:12.488	72.478	SRB major high-rate actuator command	SGTC
16:39:12.507	72.497	SSME roll gimbal rates 5°/second	SGTC
16:39:12.535	72.525	Vehicle max +Y lateral acceleration (+.227 g)	SGTC
16:39:12.574	72.564	SRB major high-rate actuator motion	SGTC
16:39:12.574	72.564	Start of H2 tank pressure decrease with two flow control valves open	SGTC
16:39:12.634	72.624	Last state vector downlinked	Data reduction
16:39:12.974	72.964	Start of sharp MPS LOX inlet pressure drop	SGTC
16:39:13	73	PLT: "Uh-oh..."	CVR
16:39:13.020	73.010	Last full computer frame of TDRS data	Data reduction
16:39:13.054	73.044	Start of sharp MPS LH2 inlet pressure drop	SGTC
16:39:13.055	73.045	Vehicle max -Y lateral acceleration (-.254 g).	SGTC
Challenger begins to disintegrate.
16:39:13.134	73.124	Circumferential white pattern on ET aft dome (LH2 tank failure). The bottom of the ET is open and liquid hydrogen spills.	E204 camera
16:39:13.134	73.124	Right-hand SRB pressure 19 psi lower than left-hand SRB	SGTC
16:39:13.147	73.137	First hint of vapor at intertank	E207 camera
16:39:13.153	73.143	All engine systems start responding to loss of fuel and LOX inlet pressure.	SSME team
16:39:13.172	73.162	Sudden cloud along ET between intertank and aft dome. The right booster slams into the ET just as the LH2 tank is thrust into the oxygen tank.	E207 camera
16:39:13.201	73.191	Flash between orbiter and LH2 tank	E204 camera
16:39:13.221	73.211	SSME telemetry data interference from 73.211 to 73.303	Data reduction
16:39:13.223	73.213	Flash near SRB forward attachment strut and brightening of flash between orbiter and ET	E204 camera
16:39:13.292	73.282	First indication intense white flash at SRB fwd attach point	E204 camera
16:39:13.337	73.327	Greatly increased intensity of white flash	E204 camera
16:39:13.387	73.377	Start of RCS jet chamber pressure fluctuations	SGTC
16:39:13.393	73.383	All engines approaching HPFT discharge temp redline limits	SGTC
16:39:13.492	73.482	ME-2 HPFT discharge temperature. Channel A votes for shutdown; two strikes on Channel B.	MEC data
16:39:13.492	73.482	SSME-2 controller last time word update	MEC data
16:39:13.513	73.503	SSME-3 in shutdown due to HPFT discharge temperature redline exceedance	MEC data
16:39:13.513	73.503	SSME-3 controller last time word update	MEC data
16:39:13.533	73.523	SSME-1 in shutdown due to HPFT discharge temperature redline exceedance	Calculation
16:39:13.553	73.543	SSME-1 last telemetered data point	Calculation
16:39:13.628	73.618	Last validated orbiter telemetry measurement	SGTC
16:39:13.641	73.631	End of last reconstructured data frame with valid synchronization and frame count	Data reduction
16:39:14.140	74.130	Last radio frequency signal from orbiter	Data reduction
Loss of downlink – Challenger is lost.
16:39:14.597	74.587	Bright flash in vicinity of orbiter nose	E204 camera
16:39:16.447	76.437	Right-hand SRB nose cap separation and parachute deployment	E207 camera
16:39:17	77	PAO: "One minute fifteen seconds. Velocity: 2900 feet per second (1977 mph). Altitude: 9 nautical miles. Downrange distance: 7 nautical miles."	NASA TV and MCC
16:39:29	89	Flight Director: "FIDO, trajectories..." FIDO: "Go ahead." Flight Director: "Trajectory, FIDO."; FIDO: "Flight, FIDO, filters got discreting sources. We're go." GC: "Flight, GC, we've had negative contact, loss of downlink." Flight Director: "OK, all operators, watch your data carefully." FIDO: "Flight, FIDO, till we get stuff back he's on his cue card for abort modes." Flight Director: "Procedures, any help?" Unknown: "Negative, flight, no data."	MCC
16:39:50.260	110.250	Destruction of right-hand SRB via range safety system	E202 camera
16:39:50.262	110.252	Destruction of left-hand SRB via range safety system	E230 camera
