= Congressional Space Medal of Honor =

American award given to astronauts

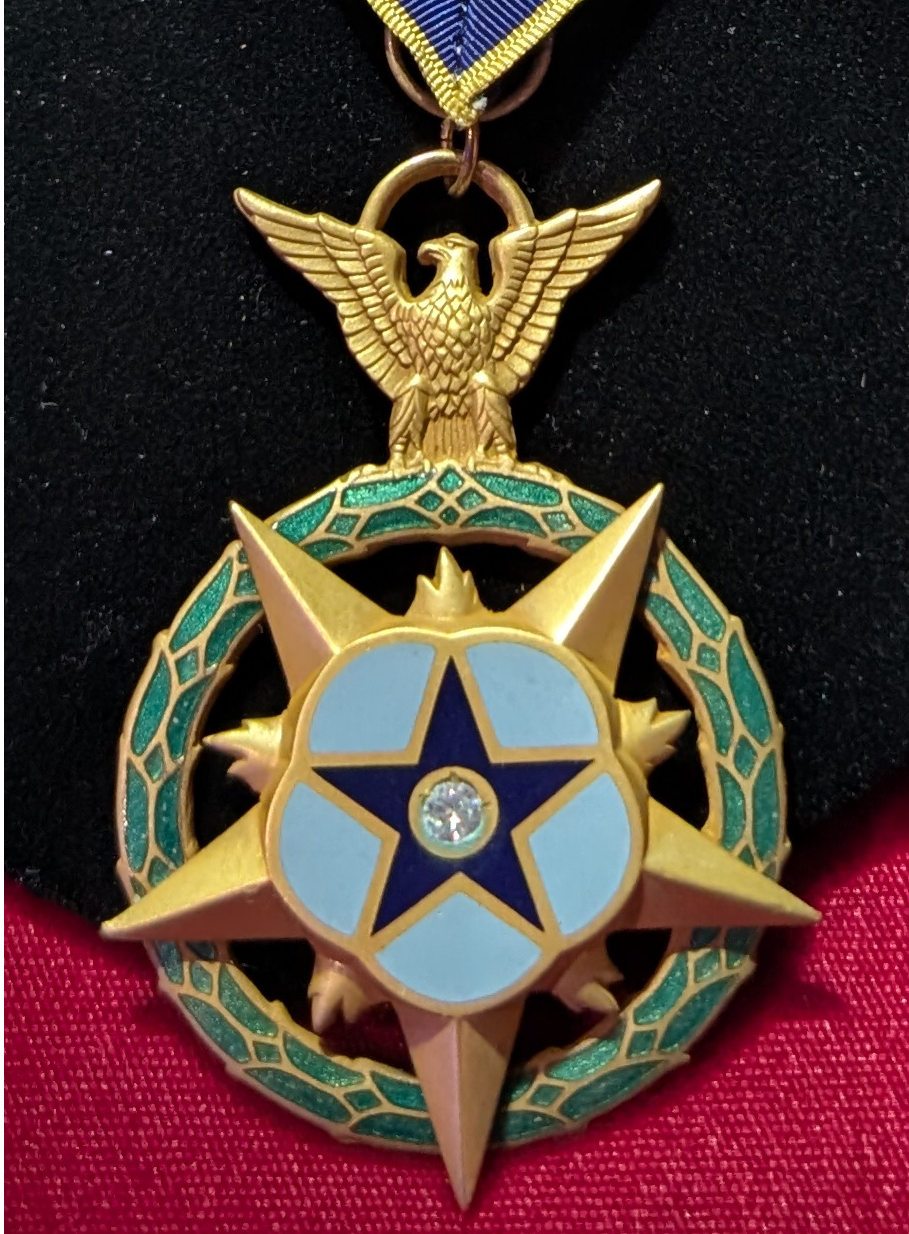
- Thomas Stafford's medal
- Type: Medal
- Awarded for: "exceptionally meritorious efforts and contributions to the welfare of the Nation and mankind"
- Country: United States
- Presented by: the United States Congress
- Eligibility: NASA astronauts
- Status: Active
- Established: September 29, 1969
- First award: October 1, 1978

Highlights
- Total: 34
- Total awarded posthumously: 17
- Congressional Space Medal of Honor ribbon

Precedence
- Next (higher): (none)
- Next (lower): NASA Distinguished Service Medal; NASA Distinguished Public Service Medal

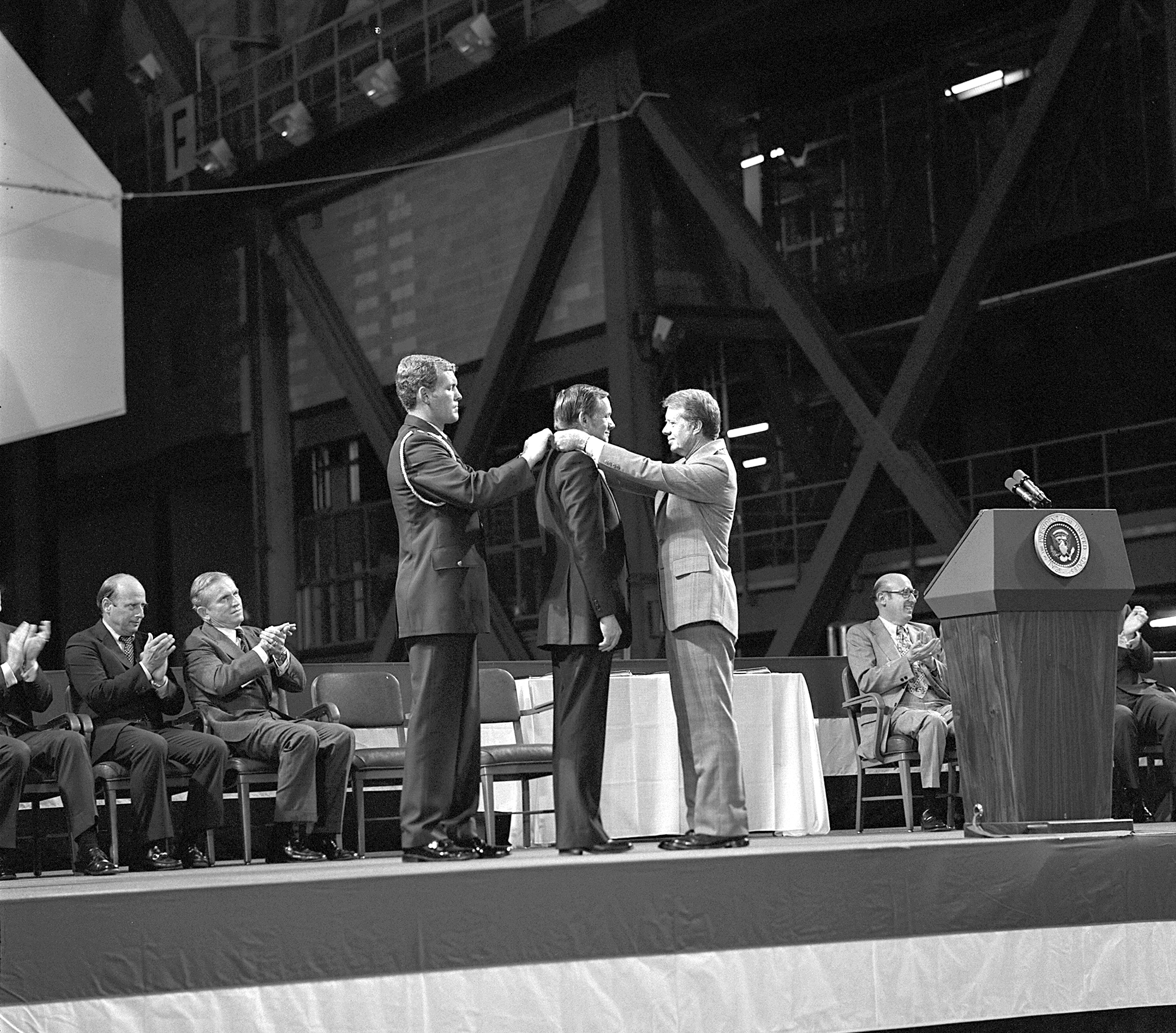
Neil Armstrong being awarded the first medal by President Jimmy Carter in 1978, with subsequent recipients Borman and Conrad seated.

The Congressional Space Medal of Honor was authorized by the United States Congress in 1969 to recognize "any astronaut who in the performance of his or her duties has distinguished himself or herself by exceptionally meritorious efforts and contributions to the welfare of the Nation and mankind". It is awarded by the president of the United States in Congress's name on recommendations from the administrator of the National Aeronautics and Space Administration. The award is a separate decoration from the Medal of Honor, which is a military award for extreme bravery and gallantry in combat. It is also notable that the military Medal of Honor decoration does not formally have "congressional" in its title. Astronauts still on active military duty are eligible for the regular Medal of Honor through their respective service, but to date, no astronaut has received the military version. This is likely because of the higher gallantry and armed conflict requirements that limit the military award to circumstances no astronaut has yet experienced.

While the Congressional Space Medal of Honor is a civilian award of the United States government, it is authorized as a non-military decoration for display on U.S. military uniforms because it is awarded by a federal agency. In such cases, the Congressional Space Medal of Honor is worn as a ribbon "immediately preceding the Prisoner of War Medal". DoD policy specifically prohibits wear of any non-military awards for valor or service, but the Congressional Space Medal of Honor only recognizes meritorious achievement, so it does not fall under this prohibition.

To be awarded the Congressional Space Medal of Honor, an astronaut must perform feats of extraordinary accomplishment while participating in space flight under the authority of NASA. Typically, the Congressional Space Medal of Honor is awarded for scientific discoveries or actions of tremendous benefit to mankind. The decoration may also be awarded for extreme bravery during a space emergency or in preventing a major space disaster, or posthumously to those astronauts who die while performing a U.S. space mission. As of 2022, all 17 astronauts killed on US missions had been awarded the medal.

President George W. Bush awarded the most CSMOH with 16; 14 of them posthumous for crews of the two destroyed space shuttle flights, Challenger and Columbia. President Joe Biden awarded the CSMOH to Crew Dragon Demo-2 members Doug Hurley and Bob Behnken on January 31, 2023. The 16-year hiatus from April 2006 to January 2023 is the longest gap between awards. The four astronauts on the Artemis II lunar flyby were awarded the medal by President Donald Trump on August 28, 2026.

== Recipients ==
The medal has been awarded to 34 astronauts, of which 17 were made posthumously for those who died preparing for or during an American spaceflight. Of those 17, three died in the Apollo 1 fire, seven died in the Space Shuttle Challenger disaster, and seven in the Space Shuttle Columbia disaster. Four of the twelve moonwalkers received the medal (Armstrong, Conrad, Shepard, and Young), but only Neil Armstrong for his lunar mission. The New Nine class of U.S. astronauts (the second group of astronauts selected by NASA) has the most recipients of the medal, with seven. Second is NASA Astronaut Group 8 which received five awards, four for astronauts killed in the Challenger disaster (Shannon Lucid is the only Group 8 astronaut to receive the award who was not killed in the Challenger disaster).

Nine recipients are living, two over 80 years old. Frank Borman was the last remaining of the first six recipients of the CSMOH in 1978.

In the table below, an asterisk indicates a posthumous award.

Photo	Name	Date	Awarded by	Notes	Ref(s)
Neil Armstrong	Neil Armstrong (1930–2012)	October 1, 1978	Jimmy Carter	Apollo 11 (Commander of the first lunar landing, first man to walk on the Moon)	
Frank Borman	Frank Borman (1928–2023)	October 1, 1978	Jimmy Carter	Apollo 8 (Commander of the first lunar orbit)	
Pete Conrad	Pete Conrad (1930–1999)	October 1, 1978	Jimmy Carter	Skylab 2 (first Skylab Commander; responsible for salvaging the critically malfunctioning station)	
John Glenn	John Glenn (1921–2016)	October 1, 1978	Jimmy Carter	Mercury-Atlas 6 (first American in orbit)	
Gus Grissom	Gus Grissom* (1926–1967)	October 1, 1978	Jimmy Carter	Mercury-Redstone 4, Gemini 3 (spacecraft commander of the first manned Gemini mission), Apollo 1 (spacecraft commander); died aboard Apollo 1	
Alan Shepard	Alan Shepard (1923–1998)	October 1, 1978	Jimmy Carter	Mercury-Redstone 3 (first American in space)	
John Young	John Young (1930–2018)	May 19, 1981	Ronald Reagan	Commander of STS-1, the first Space Shuttle mission	
Thomas Stafford	Thomas P. Stafford (1930–2024)	January 19, 1993	George H. W. Bush	Apollo–Soyuz Test Project (U.S. Commander)	
James Lovell	Jim Lovell (1928–2025)	July 26, 1995	Bill Clinton	Apollo 13 (Commander of the ill-fated mission)	
Shannon Lucid	Shannon Lucid (1943–)	December 2, 1996	Bill Clinton	Longest female spaceflight (passed by Sunita Williams)	
Roger Chaffee	Roger Chaffee* (1935–1967)	December 17, 1997	Bill Clinton	Died aboard Apollo 1	
Edward White	Ed White* (1930–1967)	December 17, 1997	Bill Clinton	Gemini 4 (first U.S. space walk) and Apollo 1; died aboard Apollo 1	
William Shepherd	William Shepherd (1949–)	January 15, 2003	George W. Bush	Expedition 1 (first ISS Commander)	
Rick Husband	Rick Husband* (1957–2003)	February 3, 2004	George W. Bush	STS-107 (died aboard Columbia)	
Willie McCool	Willie McCool* (1961–2003)	February 3, 2004	George W. Bush	STS-107 (died aboard Columbia)	
Michael Anderson	Michael P. Anderson* (1959–2003)	February 3, 2004	George W. Bush	STS-107 (died aboard Columbia)	
Kalpana Chawla	Kalpana Chawla* (1962–2003)	February 3, 2004	George W. Bush	STS-107 (died aboard Columbia)	
David Brown	David M. Brown* (1956–2003)	February 3, 2004	George W. Bush	STS-107 (died aboard Columbia)	
Laurel Clark	Laurel Clark* (1961–2003)	February 3, 2004	George W. Bush	STS-107 (died aboard Columbia)	
Ilan Ramon	Ilan Ramon* (1954–2003)	February 3, 2004	George W. Bush	STS-107 (died aboard Columbia, first non-U.S. citizen recipient)	
Dick Schobee	Dick Scobee* (1939–1986)	July 23, 2004	George W. Bush	STS-51-L (died aboard Challenger)	
Michael Smith	Michael J. Smith* (1945–1986)	July 23, 2004	George W. Bush	STS-51-L (died aboard Challenger)	
Judith Resnik	Judith Resnik* (1949–1986)	July 23, 2004	George W. Bush	STS-51-L (died aboard Challenger)	
Ronald McNair	Ronald McNair* (1950–1986)	July 23, 2004	George W. Bush	STS-51-L (died aboard Challenger)	
Ellison Onizuka	Ellison Onizuka* (1946–1986)	July 23, 2004	George W. Bush	STS-51-L (died aboard Challenger)	
Greg Jarvis	Gregory Jarvis* (1944–1986)	July 23, 2004	George W. Bush	STS-51-L (died aboard Challenger)	
Christa McAuliffe	Christa McAuliffe* (1948–1986)	July 23, 2004	George W. Bush	STS-51-L (died aboard Challenger, teacher)	
Robert Crippen	Robert Crippen (1937–)	April 26, 2006	George W. Bush	STS-1 (first Space Shuttle flight, Pilot)	
Doug Hurley	Doug Hurley (1966–)	January 31, 2023	Joe Biden	Crew Dragon Demo-2 (Commander, first astronaut crew into orbit aboard commercial vehicle)	
Bob Behnken	Bob Behnken (1970–)	January 31, 2023	Joe Biden	Crew Dragon Demo-2 (Pilot, first astronaut crew into orbit aboard commercial vehicle)	
	Reid Wiseman (1975–)	August 28, 2026	Donald Trump	Artemis II (Commander of first crewed mission beyond low Earth orbit since 1972)	
	Victor Glover (1976–)	August 28, 2026	Donald Trump	Artemis II (Pilot, first person of color to fly beyond low Earth orbit and around the Moon)	
	Christina Koch (1979–)	August 28, 2026	Donald Trump	Artemis II (Mission Specialist, first woman to fly beyond low Earth orbit and around the Moon)	
	Jeremy Hansen (1976–)	August 28, 2026	Donald Trump	Artemis II (Mission Specialist, first non-American to fly beyond low Earth orbit and around the Moon, second non-U.S. citizen recipient)	

== See also ==
- Awards and decorations of the United States government
