= Spartan Halley =

Failed NASA space mission

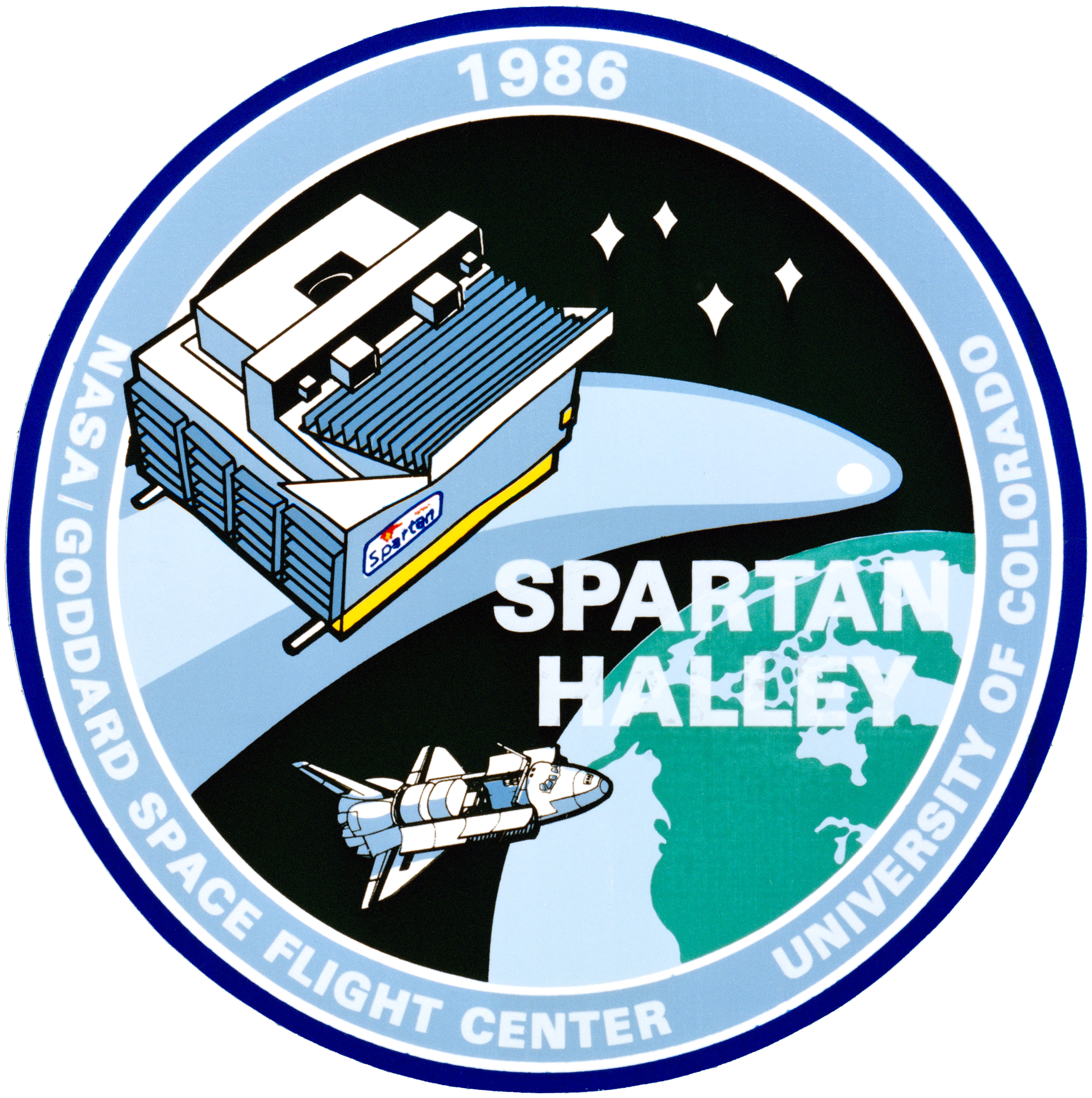
Payload insignia

Spartan Halley was a failed NASA space mission to capture the ultraviolet spectrum of comet 1P/Halley for 48 hours. This small satellite was also identified as Spartan 203 (Shuttle Pointed Autonomous Research Tool for Astronomy 203) and HCED (Halley's Comet Experiment Deployable). It was one of the payloads of the Space Shuttle Challenger for the STS-51-L mission, which exploded during launch. The principal scientist for the mission was Alan Stern.

This autonomous sub-satellite was designed by the University of Colorado. It included two spectrometers that provided an angular resolution of 1′ by 80′ in the ultraviolet band, with wavelengths from 1,250 to 3,200 Å. A Nikon camera with an f-number of 3 was to be used to determine the orientation of the instruments. Autonomous navigation was provided by solar sensors, a star tracker, gyroscopes along three axes, and dual interactive microprocessors. The main goal of the package was to measure atomic oxygen plus hydroxyl emission from the comet, which were generated by photodissociation of water. Other potentially detectable emissions included nitric oxide, carbon monoxide, carbon dioxide, and carbon monosulfide; in general, atoms and molecules that include carbon, nitrogen, and sulfur.

The launch of the Challenger mission was scheduled around the 1986 passage of Comet Halley, which was to be the primary focus of the mission. The Spartan Halley payload was to be deployed by mission specialists Ron McNair and Judy Resnik using the Canadarm, then retrieved two days later. STS-51-L launched with TDRS-B at 16:38:00 UTC on 28 January 1986. The Shuttle disintegrated 73 seconds after launch due to an O-ring failure in one of the Solid Rocket Boosters, killing the seven astronauts aboard and destroying Spartan Halley. Debris from Spartan Halley was recovered along with the wreckage of Challenger, and was later buried with it at the silo of Cape Canaveral Launch Complex 31.
