= Mohawk, New York =

Mohawk is the name of some places in the U.S. state of New York:

- Mohawk, Herkimer County, New York, a village
- Mohawk, Montgomery County, New York, a town
