= STS-51-L =

Failed 1986 American crewed spaceflight

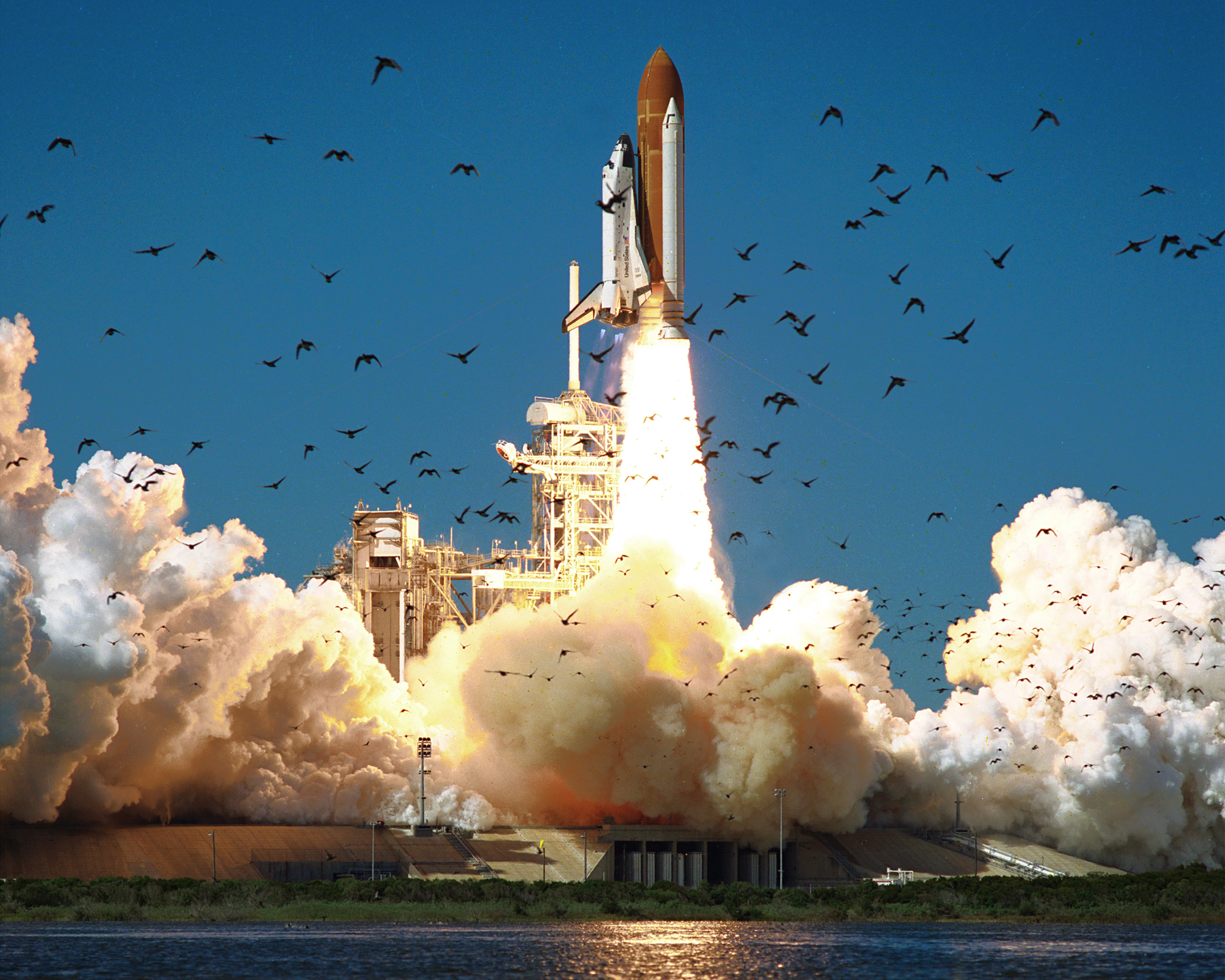
- Challenger launches at the start of STS-51-L. 73 seconds later, the right SRB aft strut would fail, causing the aerodynamic breakup of the orbiter and the deaths of all 7 crew on board.
- Names: Space Transportation System-25
- Mission type: Satellite deployment
- Operator: NASA
- Mission duration: 6 days and 34 minutes (planned); 1 minute and 13 seconds (achieved)
- Distance travelled: 29 km (18 mi)
- Orbits completed: Failed to achieve orbit (96 planned)

Spacecraft properties
- Spacecraft: Space Shuttle Challenger
- Launch mass: 1,217,990 kg (2,685,210 lb)
- Landing mass: 90,584 kg (199,704 lb) (planned)
- Payload mass: 21,937 kg (48,363 lb)

Crew
- Crew size: 7
- Members: Francis R. "Dick" Scobee; Michael J. Smith; Ellison S. Onizuka; Judith A. Resnik; Ronald E. McNair; Gregory B. Jarvis; S. Christa McAuliffe

Start of mission
- Launch date: January 28, 1986, 16:38:00 UTC (11:38 am EST)
- Launch site: Kennedy, LC-39B
- Contractor: Rockwell International

End of mission
- Destroyed: January 28, 1986, 16:39:13 UTC (11:39:13 am EST)
- Landing date: February 3, 1986, 17:12:00 UTC (12:12 pm EST) (planned)
- Landing site: Kennedy, SLF Runway 33 (planned)

Orbital parameters
- Reference system: Geocentric orbit (planned)
- Regime: Low Earth orbit
- Perigee altitude: 285 km (177 mi)
- Apogee altitude: 295 km (183 mi)
- Inclination: 28.45°
- Period: 90.40 minutes

Instruments
- Comet Halley Active Monitoring Program (CHAMP); Fluid Dynamics Experiment (FDE); Phase Partitioning Experiment (PPE); Shuttle Pointed Autonomous Research Tool for Astronomy (SPARTAN-203); Shuttle Student Involvement Program (SSIP); Teacher in Space Project (TISP)
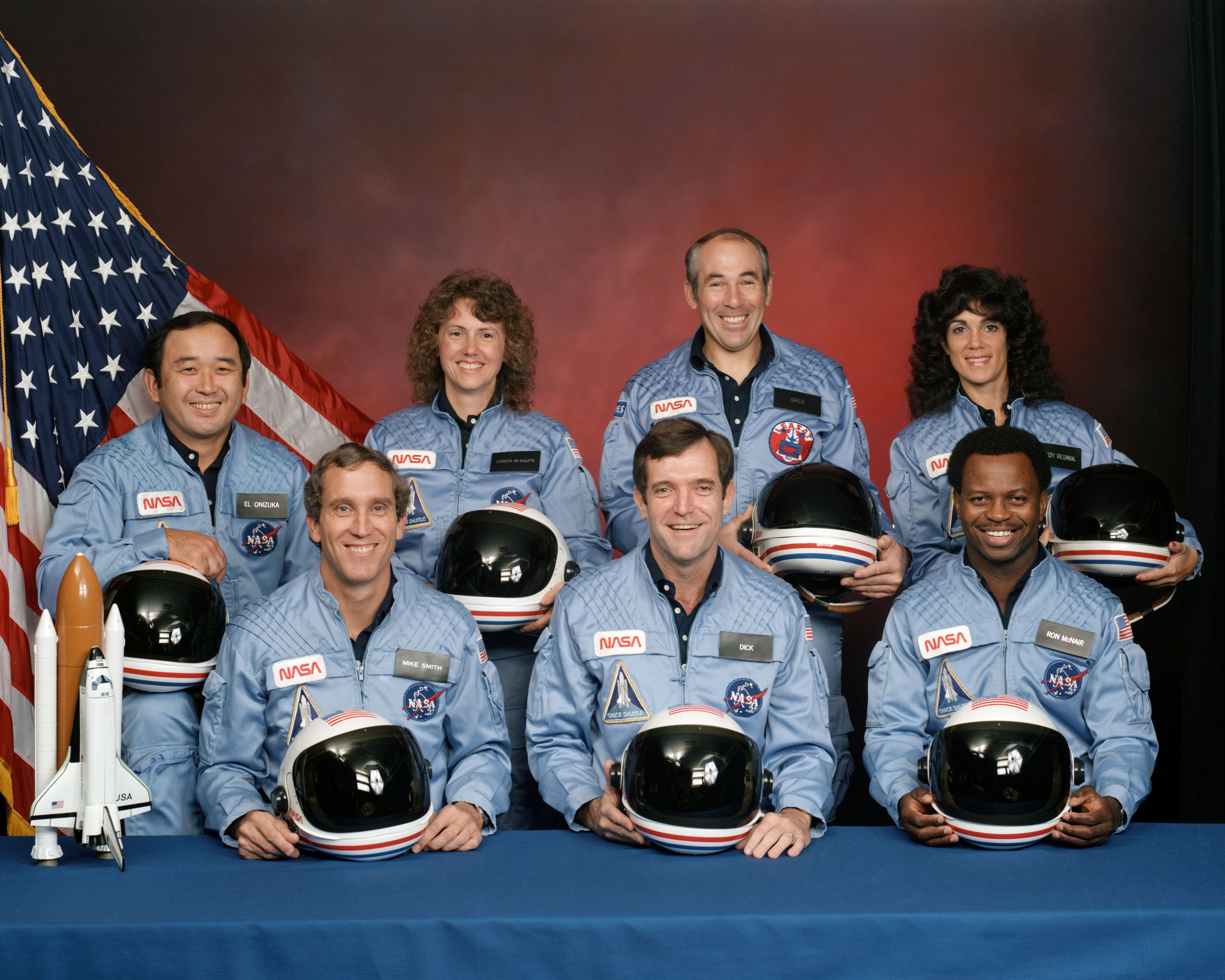
- STS-51-L mission patch Back row: Onizuka, McAuliffe, Jarvis and Resnik; Front row: Smith, Scobee and McNair Space Shuttle program

STS-51-L was the 25th mission of NASA's Space Shuttle program which resulted in the loss of 7 lives and Space Shuttle Challenger.

It was planned as the first Teacher in Space Project flight in addition to observing Halley's Comet for six days and performing a routine satellite deployment. The mission did not achieve orbit; a structural failure during its ascent phase 73 seconds after launch from Kennedy Space Center Launch Complex 39B on January 28, 1986, destroyed the orbiter and killed all seven crew members—Commander Francis R. "Dick" Scobee, Pilot Michael J. Smith, Mission Specialists Ellison S. Onizuka, Judith A. Resnik and Ronald E. McNair, and Payload Specialists Gregory B. Jarvis and S. Christa McAuliffe. Bob Ebeling, engineer at Morton-Thiokol, manufacturer of the SRBs, recalled having stated about the decision to launch in freezing 18 degree weather:

"...we're only qualified to 40 degrees. I said 'what business does anyone even have thinking about 18 degrees, we're in no man's land, we're in a big grey area."

Immediately after the failure, President Ronald Reagan convened the Rogers Commission to determine the cause of the explosion. The failure of an O-ring seal on the starboard Solid Rocket Booster (SRB) was determined to have caused the shuttle to break up in flight. Space Shuttle flights were suspended for 32 months while the O-rings and other hazards that could have destroyed the vehicle on following missions were addressed. Shuttle missions resumed in September 1988 with STS-26.

== Planned mission ==
The tenth mission for Challenger, STS-51-L, was scheduled to deploy the second in a series of Tracking and Data Relay Satellites (TDRS-B), carry out the first flight of the "Shuttle Pointed Autonomous Research Tool for Astronomy" (SPARTAN-203) / Halley's Comet Experiment Deployable in order to observe Halley's Comet, and carry out several lessons from space as part of the Teacher in Space Project and Shuttle Student Involvement Program (SSIP). The flight marked the first American orbital mission to involve in-flight fatalities. It was also the first American human spaceflight mission to launch and fail to reach space; the first such mission in the world had been the Soviet Soyuz 18a mission, in which the two crew members had survived. Gregory Jarvis was originally scheduled to fly on the previous shuttle flight (STS-61-C), but he was reassigned to this flight and replaced by Congressman Clarence W. "Bill" Nelson.

== Crew ==
Position	Astronaut
Commander	Francis R. "Dick" Scobee; Second and last space mission
Pilot	Michael J. Smith; Only space mission
Mission Specialist 1	Ellison S. Onizuka; Second and last space mission
Mission Specialist 2 Flight Engineer	Judith A. Resnik; Second and last space mission
Mission Specialist 3	Ronald E. McNair; Second and last space mission
Payload Specialist 1	S. Christa McAuliffe; Only space mission Teacher in Space Project
Payload Specialist 2	Gregory B. Jarvis; Only space mission Hughes Space and Communications

=== Backup crew ===
Position	Astronaut
Payload Specialist 1	Barbara R. Morgan; Teacher in Space Project
Payload Specialist 2	L. William Butterworth; Hughes Space and Communications
Morgan would be selected as a NASA astronaut in 1998 and flew on STS-118 in 2007 as a mission specialist.

=== Crew seat assignments ===
This seating assignment chart depicts what would have happened if the mission had been performed as planned.

Seat	Launch	Landing (planned)	Seats 1–4 are on the flight deck. Seats 5–7 are on the mid-deck.
1	Scobee		Seats 1–4 are on the flight deck. Seats 5–7 are on the mid-deck.
2	Smith		Seats 1–4 are on the flight deck. Seats 5–7 are on the mid-deck.
3	Onizuka	McNair	Seats 1–4 are on the flight deck. Seats 5–7 are on the mid-deck.
4	Resnik		Seats 1–4 are on the flight deck. Seats 5–7 are on the mid-deck.
5	McNair	Onizuka	Seats 1–4 are on the flight deck. Seats 5–7 are on the mid-deck.
6	Jarvis		Seats 1–4 are on the flight deck. Seats 5–7 are on the mid-deck.
7	McAuliffe		Seats 1–4 are on the flight deck. Seats 5–7 are on the mid-deck.

== Ascent failure and disaster ==
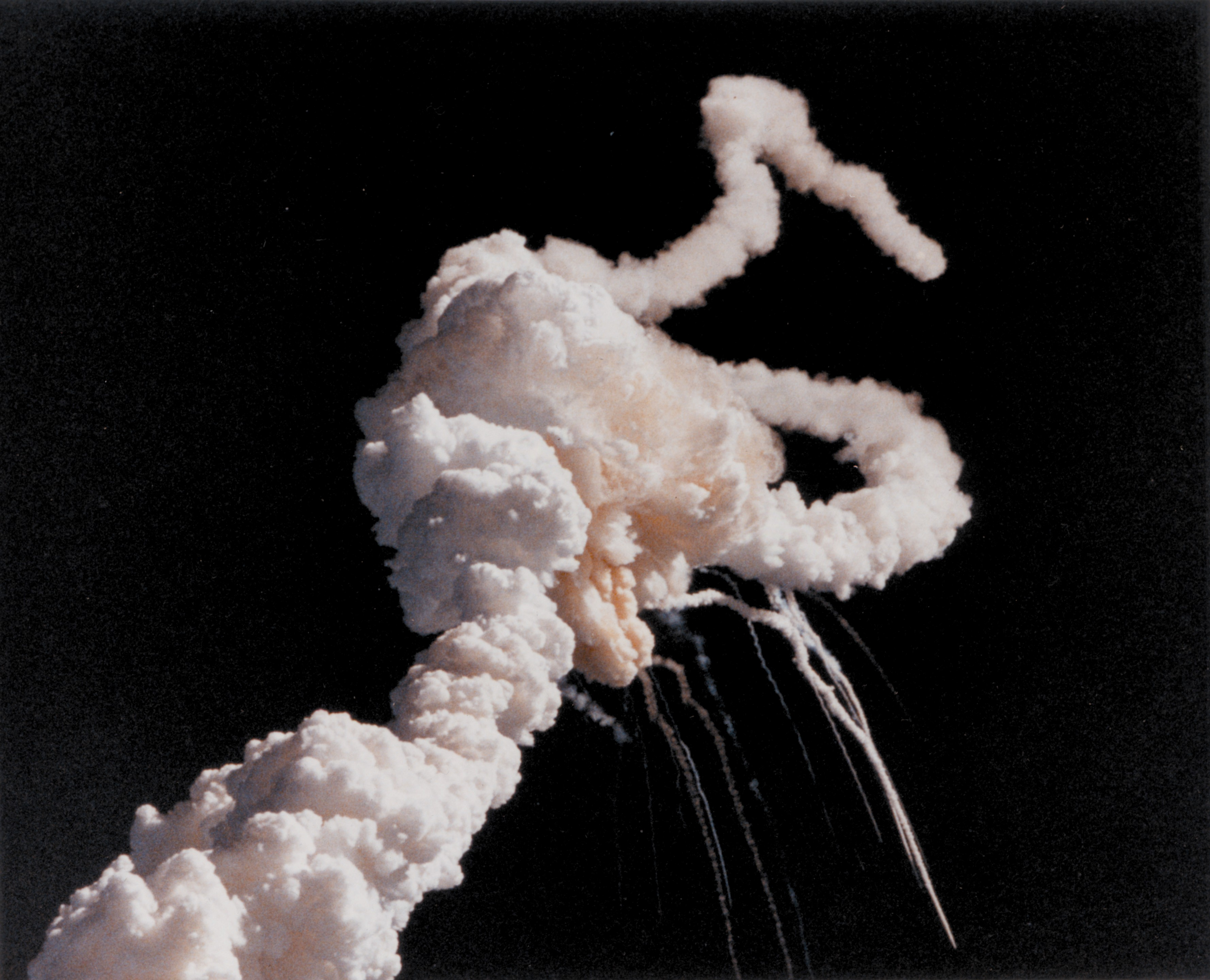
Challenger after the explosion 73 seconds after launch

During the ascent phase, 73 seconds after liftoff, the vehicle experienced a catastrophic structural failure resulting in the loss of crew and vehicle. The Rogers Commission later determined the cause of the accident to have been the failure of the primary and secondary (backup) O-ring seals on Challenger's right Solid Rocket Booster (SRB). The failure of these seals allowed a flamethrower-like flare to impinge upon one of two aft SRB attach struts, which eventually failed, freeing the booster to pivot about its remaining attachment points. The forward part of the booster cylinder struck the external tank inter-tank area, leading to a structural failure of the Space Shuttle external tank (ET) – the core structural component of the entire stack. A rapid burning of liberated propellants ensued. With the structural "backbone" of the stack compromised and breaking up, the SRBs flew off on their own, as did the orbiter, which rapidly broke up due to overwhelming aerodynamic forces. The launch had been approved despite a predicted ambient temperature of 27 °F (−3 °C), well below the qualification limit of major components such as the SRBs, which had been certified for use only at temperatures above 39 °F (4 °C). Evidence found in the remnants of the crew cabin showed that several of the emergency Personal Egress Air Packs (PEAPs) carried by the astronauts had been manually activated, suggesting that forces experienced inside the cabin during breakup of the orbiter were not inherently fatal, and that at least three crew members were alive and capable of conscious action for a period following vehicle breakup. "Tracking reported that the vehicle had exploded [sic] and impacted the water in an area approximately located at 28.64° north, 80.28° west."

== Crew fate ==
Divers from the USS Preserver located what they believed to be the crew cabin on the ocean floor on March 7, 1986. A dive the following day confirmed that it was the cabin and that the remains of the crew were inside. No official investigation into the Challenger disaster has determined the cause of death of the astronauts; it is almost certain that the breakup itself did not kill the entire crew as 3 of the 4 Personal Egress Air Packs (PEAPs) that were recovered had been manually activated. This would only be done during an emergency or loss of cabin pressure. PEAPs do not provide a pressurized air flow and would still have resulted in the astronauts losing consciousness within several seconds. There were media reports alleging that NASA had a tape recording of the crew panicking and on-board conversation following the explosion during the 2 minute 45 second free fall before hitting the sea east of Florida. This was likely fabricated and no recording exists, as the crew may have been unconscious from loss of cabin pressure and the astronauts did not wear individual voice recorders.

== Mission objectives ==
- Deployment of Tracking Data Relay Satellite-B (TDRS-B) with an Inertial Upper Stage (IUS) booster
- Flight of "Shuttle Pointed Autonomous Research Tool for Astronomy" (SPARTAN-203)/Halley's Comet Experiment Deployable
- Fluid Dynamics Experiment (FDE)
- Comet Halley Active Monitoring Program (CHAMP)
- Phase Partitioning Experiment (PPE)
- Three Shuttle Student Involvement Program (SSIP) experiments
- Two lessons for the Teacher in Space Project (TISP)
- (unofficial) Ronald E. McNair was planning to play the saxophone in space for a track on Jean-Michel Jarre's album "Rendez-Vous".

Attempt	Planned	Result	Turnaround	Reason	Decision point	Weather go (%)	Notes
1	25 Jan 1986, 9:37:00 am	Scrubbed	—	Weather			Weather at transatlantic abort site
2	27 Jan 1986, 9:37:00 am	Scrubbed	2 days 0 hours 0 minutes	Weather and technical	27 Jan 1986, 12:35 pm (T−00:09:00 hold)		Equipment failures in orbiter closeout, cross winds at shuttle landing site.
3	28 Jan 1986, 11:38:00 am	Failure	1 day 2 hours 1 minute	Technical	28 Jan 1986, 11:39 am (T+00:01:13)		Originally scheduled for 9:37 AM, the launch was delayed due to technical issues with fire detection system. Loss of crew and vehicle. Right SRB O-ring failure and orbiter vehicle disintegration.

== Mission insignia ==
Francis R. "Dick" Scobee asked Kennedy Space Center engineer Ernie Reyes to design the mission patch seen above to represent the mission STS-51-L. In it, Challenger is depicted launching from Florida and soaring into space to carry out a variety of goals. Among the prescribed duties of the five astronauts and two payload specialists (represented by the seven stars of the U.S. flag) was observation and photography of Halley's Comet, backdropped against the U.S. flag in the insignia. Surnames of the crew members encircle the scene, with the payload specialists being recognized below. The surname of the first teacher in space, S. Christa McAuliffe, is followed by a symbolic apple.

== See also ==
- Apollo 1
- STS-51-L mission timeline
- Space Shuttle Columbia disaster
  - STS-107, Columbia's last Shuttle flight
- Space Shuttle program
- Challenger Center for Space Science Education
- STS-26: The "Back to Flight" mission staged by Discovery in 1988.
