= Auburn Municipal Airport (Washington) =

Auburn Municipal Airport Dick Scobee Field
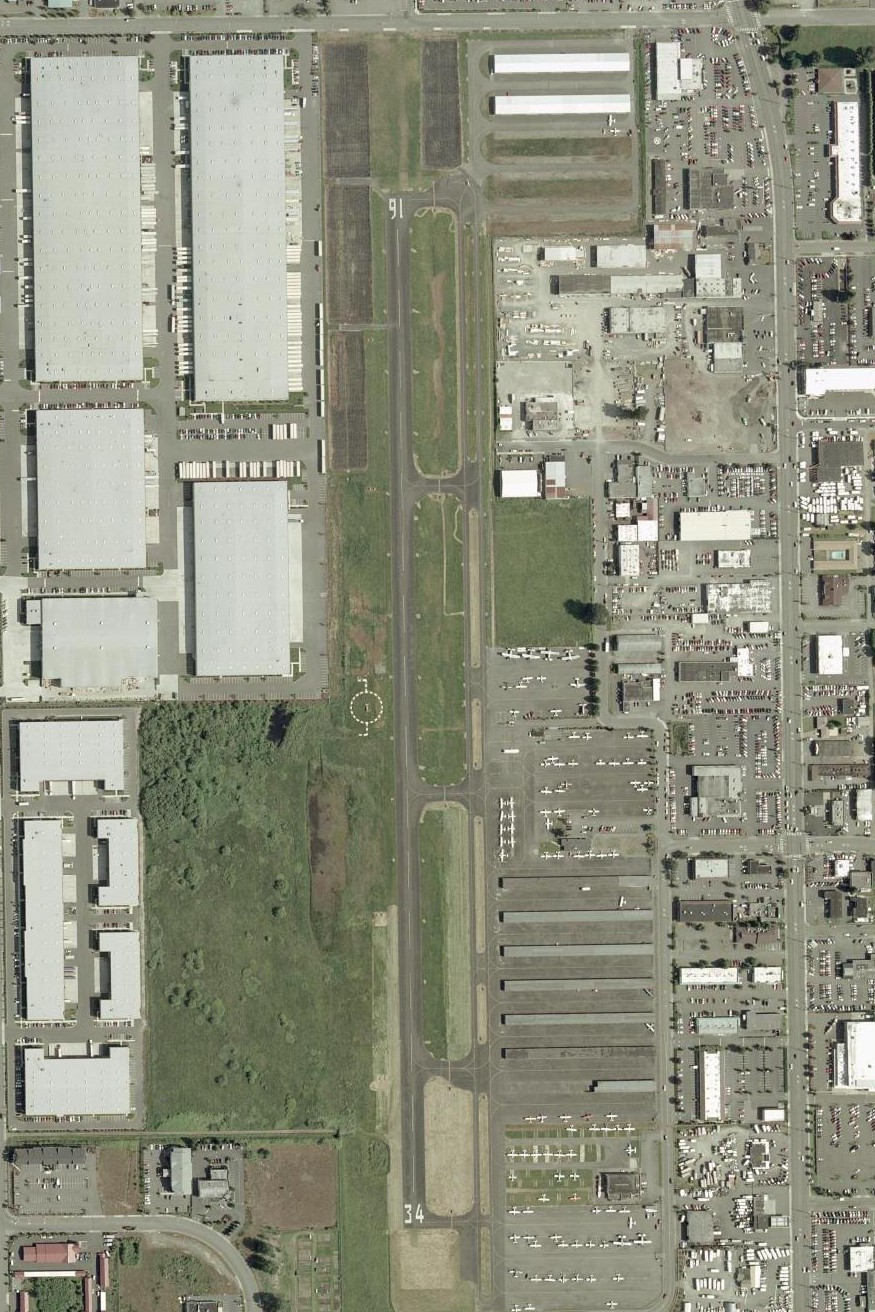
- IATA: none; ICAO: none; FAA LID: S50

Summary
- Airport type: Public
- Owner: City of Auburn
- Operator: Airport Management Group
- Serves: Auburn, Washington
- Location: Auburn, Washington
- Elevation AMSL: 63 ft (19 m)
- Coordinates: 47°19′39″N 122°13′35″W
- Website: auburnmunicipalairport.com

Map
- Location within Washington (state) Location within the United States

Runways
| Direction | Length | | Surface |
| Direction | ft | m | Surface |
|---|---|---|---|
| 17/35 | 3,842 | 1,171 | Asphalt |

Statistics
- Aircraft operations (2019): 140,000
- Based aircraft (2019): 264
- Source: Federal Aviation Administration

Auburn Municipal Airport (FAA LID: S50) is two miles north of downtown Auburn, in King County, Washington.

The airport is referred to as Dick Scobee Field, after Francis "Dick" Scobee, an Auburn and Washington native who was the commander astronaut for the Space Shuttle Challenger. Scobee was killed in the 1986 Challenger disaster.

The Federal Aviation Administration (FAA) National Plan of Integrated Airport Systems for 2017–2021 categorized it as a regional reliever facility.

== Facilities ==
The airport covers 110 acres (45 ha) and has one asphalt runway. It has no scheduled airline service. In the year ending December 31, 2019, 264 aircraft were based at Auburn, including 240 single engine, 15 multi-engine aircraft, 7 helicopters, and 2 gliders. In 2019, the airport averaged 383 operations per day.

The closest commercial airport outside of Auburn, Washington is Seattle-Tacoma International Airport, 8 nautical miles (15 km; 9.2 mi) northwest, in SeaTac, Washington.

The Airport is supplied with both 100LL grade and Jet A aviation fuel. Rates are posted on the Auburn Municipal Airport Website.

== See also ==
- List of airports in Washington
