= Personal Egress Air Pack =

Backup air supplies on the Space Shuttle

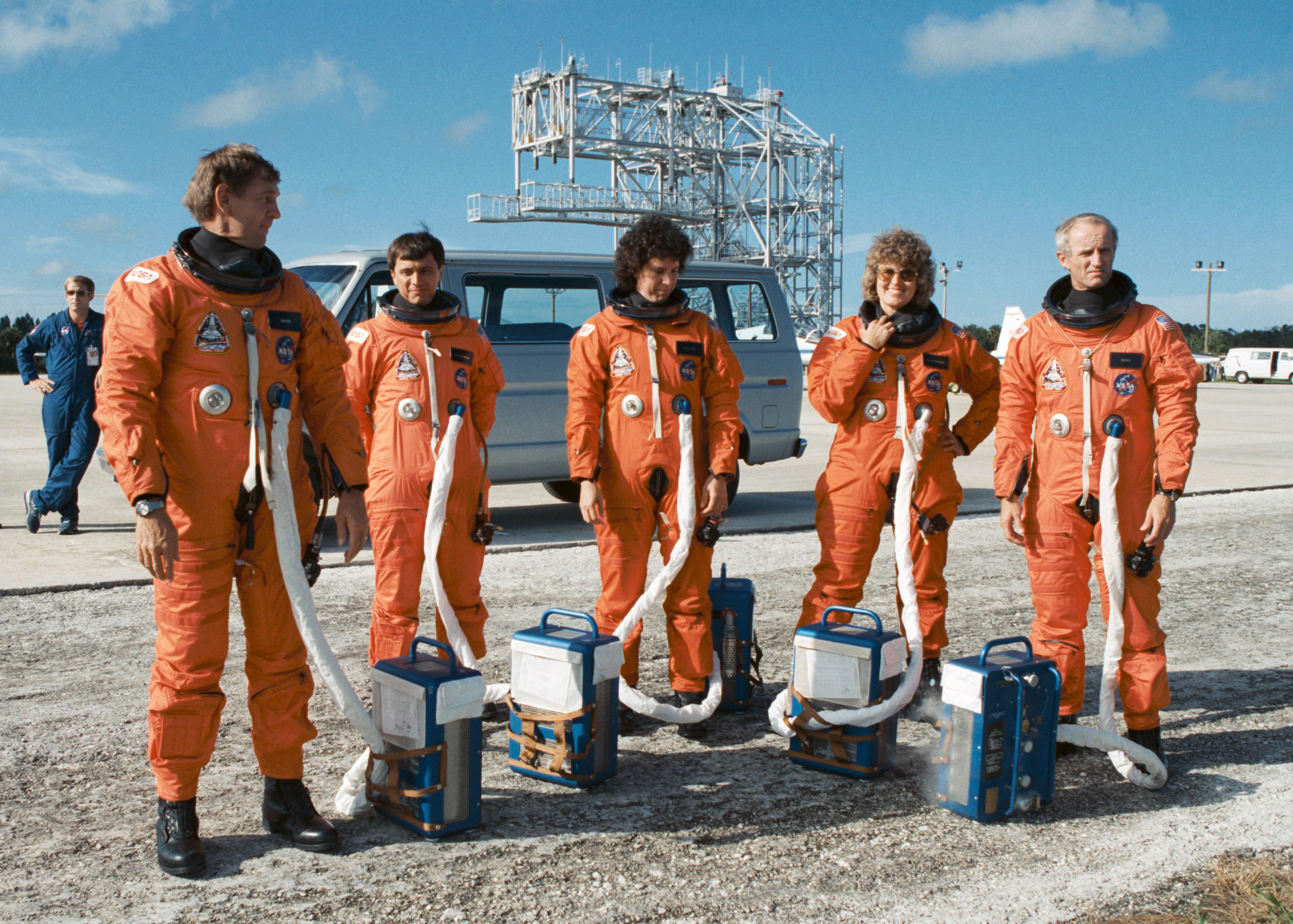
Astronauts from STS-34 stand next to their PEAPs in 1989

Personal Egress Air Packs, or PEAPs, were devices on board a Space Shuttle that provided crew members with about six minutes of breathable air in the case of a mishap while the vehicle was still on the ground. PEAPs did not provide pressurized air, meaning they were only intended to be used if the air inside the shuttle cabin became unbreathable because of noxious gases.

The devices gained public attention after the Challenger disaster. After the recovery of the vehicle cockpit, it was found that three of the crew PEAPs were activated: those of mission specialist Ellison Onizuka, mission specialist Judith Resnik, and pilot Michael J. Smith. The location of Smith's activation switch, on the back side of his seat, means that either Resnik or Onizuka likely activated it for him. Mike Mullane writes:

"Mike Smith’s PEAP had been turned on by Judy or El, I wondered if I would have had the presence of mind to do the same thing had I been in Challenger’s cockpit. Or would I have been locked in a catatonic paralysis of fear? There had been nothing in our training concerning the activation of a PEAP in the event of an in-flight emergency. The fact that Judy or El had done so for Mike Smith made them heroic in my mind. They had been able to block out the terrifying sights and sounds and motions of Challenger’s destruction and had reached for that switch. It was the type of thing a true astronaut would do—maintain their cool in the direst of circumstances."

This showed that at least two of the crew members (Onizuka and Resnik) were alive after the cockpit separated from the vehicle. However, if the cabin had lost pressure, the packs alone would not have sustained the crew during the two-minute descent.

The partial-pressure launch-entry suits replaced the PEAPs, which were subsequently followed by the "ACES" full-pressure suits, which include self-contained oxygen tanks.
