= Michael J. Smith =

American astronaut (1945–1986)

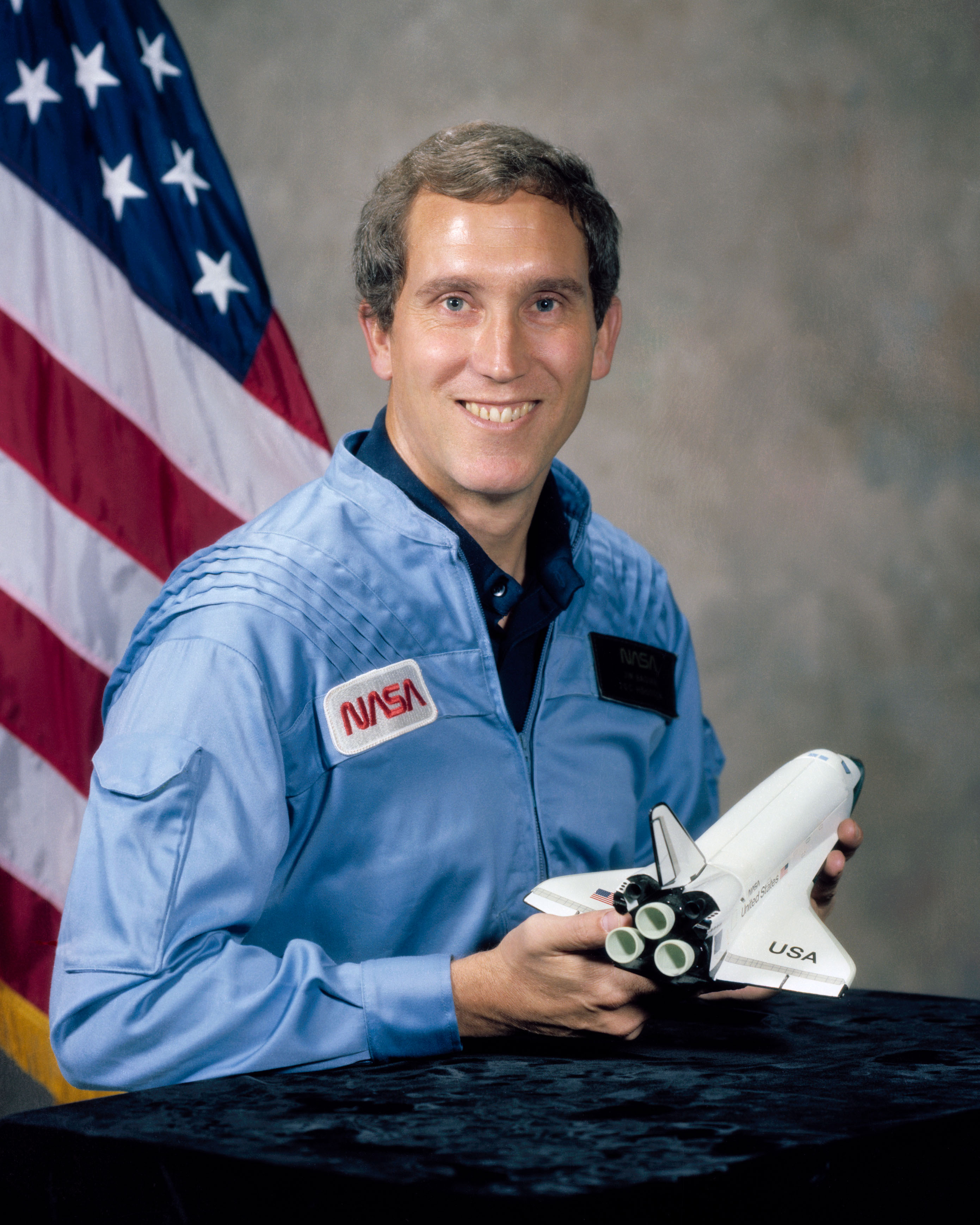
- Smith in 1981
- Born: Michael John Smith; April 30, 1945; Beaufort, North Carolina, U.S.
- Died: January 28, 1986 (aged 40); North Atlantic Ocean
- Cause of death: Space Shuttle Challenger disaster
- Resting place: Arlington National Cemetery
- Education: United States Naval Academy (BS); Naval Postgraduate School (MS)
- Awards: Distinguished Flying Cross; Congressional Space Medal of Honor; Air Medal
- Space career

NASA astronaut
- Rank: Captain, USN
- Selection: NASA Group 9 (1980)
- Missions: STS-51-L
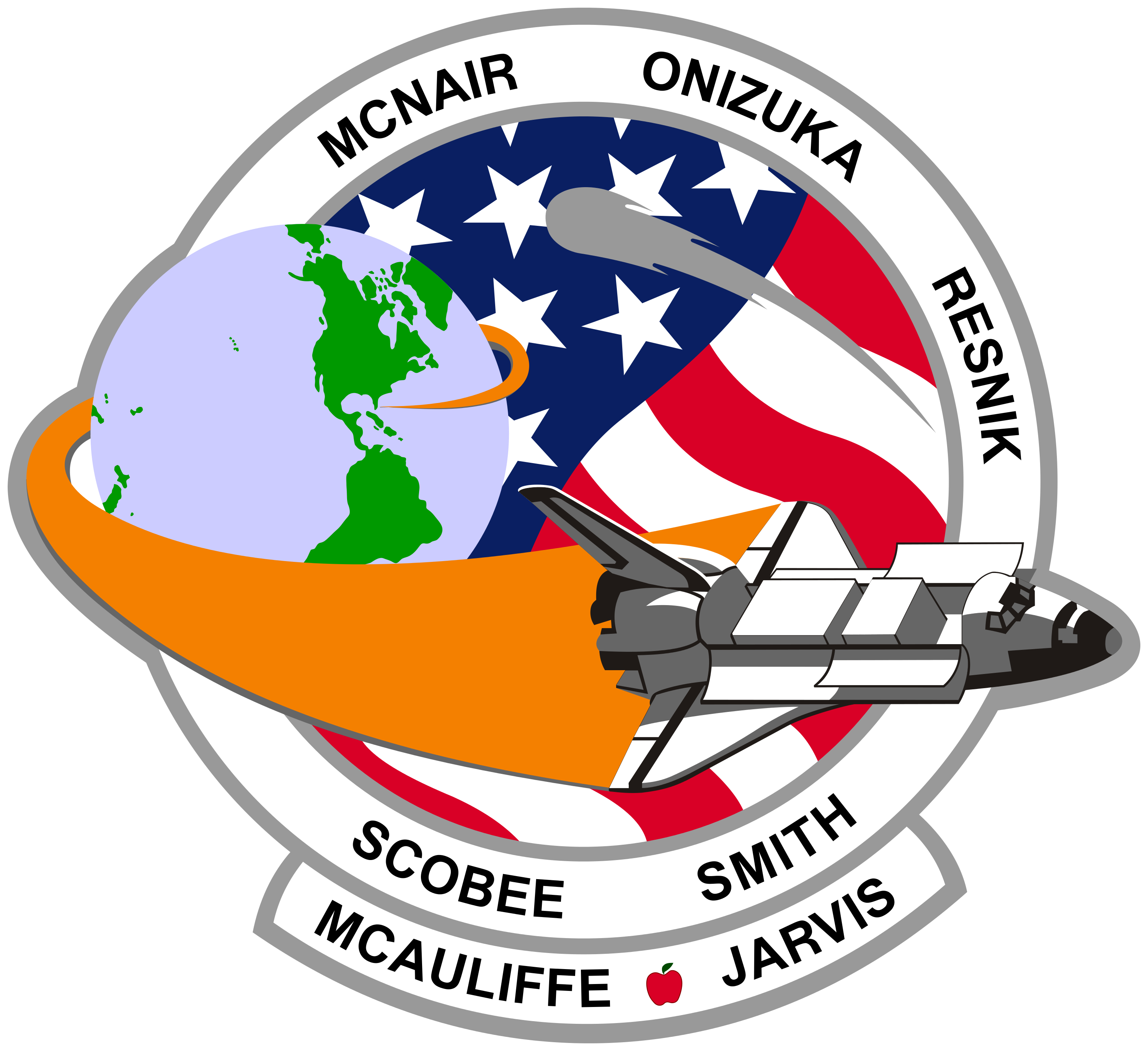
- Mission insignia

Michael John Smith (April 30, 1945 – January 28, 1986), (Capt USN) was an American engineer and astronaut. He served as the pilot of the Space Shuttle Challenger when it was destroyed during the STS-51-L mission, breaking up 73 seconds into the flight, and at an altitude of 48,000 feet (14.6 km), killing all seven crew members. Smith's voice was the last one heard on the Challenger voice recorder.

During his Naval career, Smith flew 28 different types of civilian and military aircraft and logged 4,867 hours of flying time. Following the Challenger disaster, he was promoted posthumously to the rank of captain, and has had a chair named in his honor at the Naval Postgraduate School (NPS) in Monterey, California.

== Early life and military career ==
Smith was born April 30, 1945, in Beaufort, North Carolina. He graduated from Beaufort High School in 1963 and went on to receive a Bachelor of Science degree in Naval Science from the United States Naval Academy in 1967.

Smith subsequently attended the U.S. Naval Postgraduate School at Monterey, California, from which he graduated with a Master of Science degree in Aeronautical Engineering in 1968. Smith was awarded a Marshall Scholarship and went on to complete naval aviation jet training at Naval Air Station Kingsville, Texas, receiving his aviator wings in May 1969. Smith was then assigned to the Advanced Jet Training Command (VT-21) where he served as an instructor from May 1969 to March 1971. During the two-year period that followed, Smith flew A-6 Intruders and completed a tour in 1972 during the Vietnam War while assigned to Attack Squadron 52 (VA-52) aboard the aircraft carrier USS Kitty Hawk. During his deployment with VA-52, Smith took part in Operation Linebacker, the first continuous bombing effort conducted against North Vietnam since 1968.

After returning from Vietnam, Smith attended U.S. Naval Test Pilot School (NTPS), graduating from the program in 1974. Following NTPS, he was assigned to the Strike Aircraft Test Directorate at NAS Patuxent River, Maryland, to work on the A-6E TRAM and Cruise missile guidance systems. Smith returned to NTPS in 1976 and completed an 18-month assignment there as an instructor. From Patuxent River, he was assigned to Attack Squadron 75 (VA-75), serving as a maintenance and operations officer while completing two Mediterranean cruises aboard the aircraft carrier USS Saratoga.

During his time in the Navy, Smith flew 28 different types of civilian and military aircraft, cumulating in 4,867.7 hours of flying time.

== Astronaut career ==
Smith was selected for the astronaut program in May 1980; he served as a commander in the Shuttle Avionics Integration Laboratory (SAIL), Deputy Chief of Aircraft Operations Division, Technical Assistant to the Director, Flight Operations Directorate, and was also assigned to the Astronaut Office Development and Test Group. In addition to being pilot on the Challenger, Smith had been slated to pilot a future Shuttle mission (STS-61-I) which had been scheduled for Fall 1986. Smith's voice was the last one heard on the flight deck tape recorder aboard Challenger; his final remark was "Uh oh."

Following the Challenger disaster, examination of the recovered vehicle cockpit revealed that three of the crew members' Personal Egress Air Packs were activated: those of Smith, mission specialist Judith Resnik, and mission specialist Ellison Onizuka. The location of Smith's activation switch, on the back side of his seat, means that either Resnik or Onizuka must have activated it for him. Further investigation by Smith's wife suggested that it was Onizuka who activated her husband's switch because Resnik's seat location was too far to reach Smith. This is the only evidence available from the disaster that shows Onizuka and Resnik were alive after the cockpit separated from the vehicle. However, if the cabin had lost pressure, the packs alone would not have sustained the crew during the two-minute descent.

While analyzing the wreckage, investigators discovered that several electrical system switches on Smith's right-hand panel had been moved from their usual launch positions. Fellow Astronaut Richard Mullane wrote, "These switches were protected with lever locks that required them to be pulled outward against a spring force before they could be moved to a new position." Later tests established that neither the force of the explosion, nor the impact with the ocean could have moved them indicating that Smith made the switch changes, presumably in an attempt to restore electrical power to the cockpit after the crew cabin detached from the rest of the orbiter.

== Family ==
Smith is survived by his wife, Jane (née Jarrell), and three children: Scott, Allison, and Erin. He enjoyed woodworking, running, tennis, and squash.

== Recognition ==
Smith was posthumously awarded the Congressional Space Medal of Honor in 2004, along with all crew members lost in the Challenger and Columbia accidents. He also received the Defense Distinguished Service Medal (posthumous), the Navy Distinguished Flying Cross, three Air Medals, 13 Strike/Flight Air Medals, the Navy Commendation Medal with "V" Device, the Navy Unit Citation, and the Vietnam Cross of Gallantry with Silver Star.

The Michael J. Smith Field airfield in his hometown of Beaufort, North Carolina is named after Smith.

Smith was portrayed by Brian Kerwin in the 1990 TV movie Challenger.

== See also ==
- Space Shuttle Challenger disaster
