= Dick Scobee =

American astronaut (1939–1986)

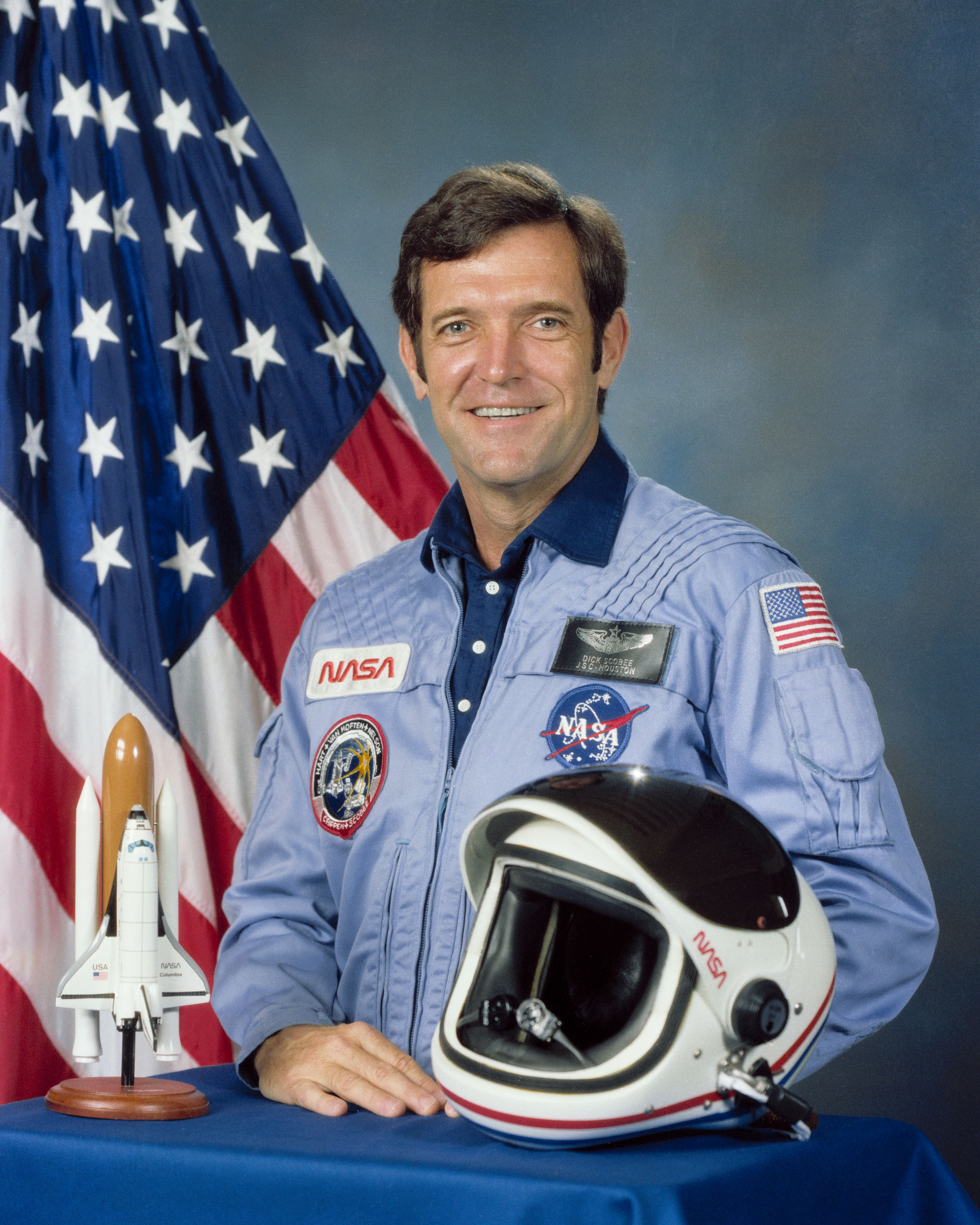
- Scobee in 1984
- Born: Francis Richard Scobee; May 19, 1939; Cle Elum, Washington, U.S.
- Died: January 28, 1986 (aged 46); North Atlantic Ocean
- Cause of death: Space Shuttle Challenger disaster
- Resting place: Arlington National Cemetery
- Education: University of Arizona (BS)
- Awards: Distinguished Flying Cross; Congressional Space Medal of Honor
- Space career

NASA astronaut
- Rank: Lieutenant colonel, USAF
- Time in space: 6d 23h 40m
- Selection: NASA Group 8 (1978)
- Mission: STS-41-C; STS-51-L
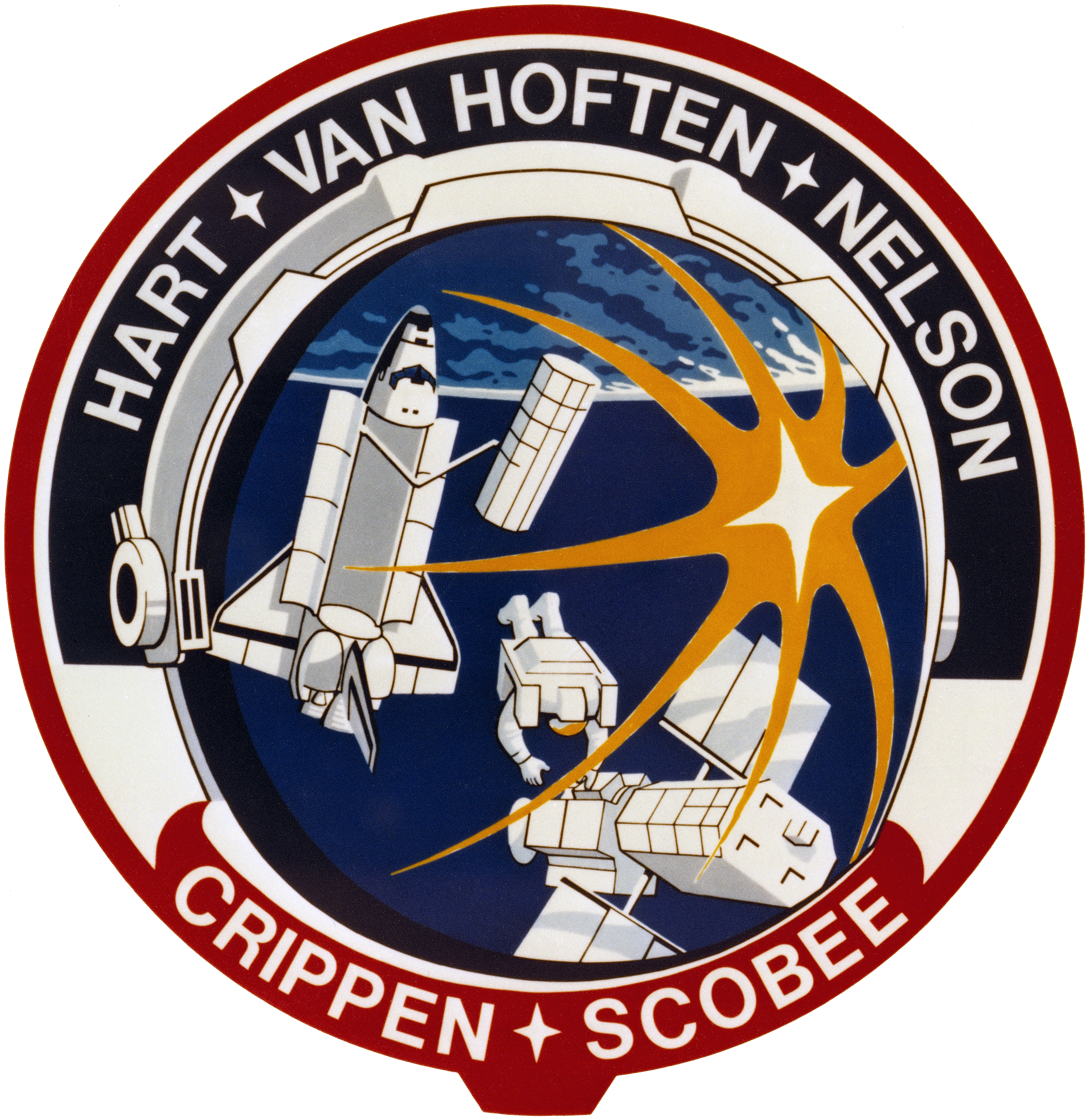
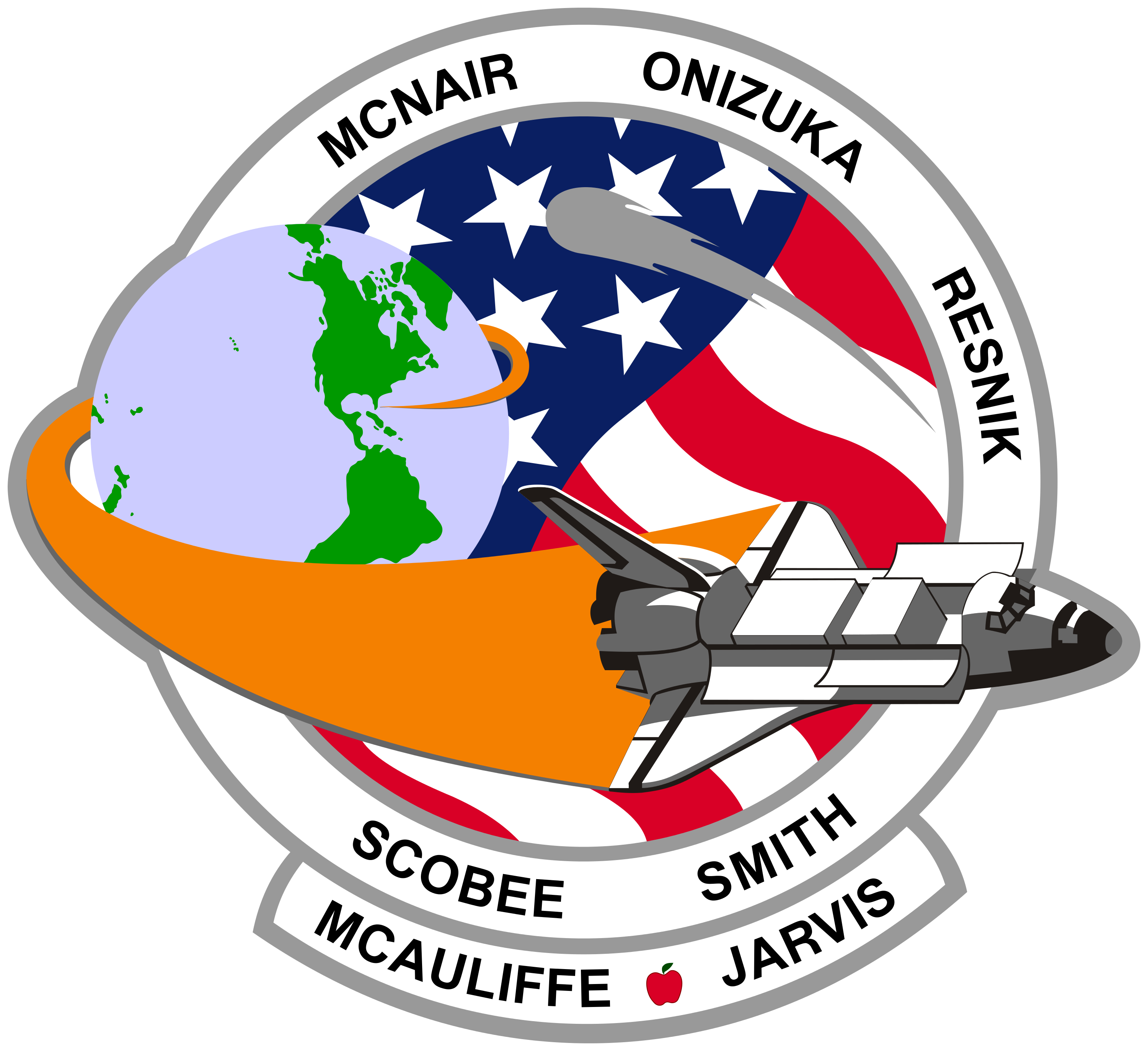
- Mission insignia

Francis Richard Scobee (May 19, 1939 – January 28, 1986) was an American pilot, engineer, and astronaut. He was killed while commanding the Space Shuttle Challenger in 1986, which suffered catastrophic booster failure during launch of the STS-51-L mission.

Scobee held a Bachelor of Science degree in Aerospace Engineering, graduating from the University of Arizona in 1965. He was a reciprocating engine mechanic for the United States Air Force and served as a combat aviator in the Vietnam War.

Selected for NASA Astronaut Corps in January 1978, Scobee completed his training in August 1979. While awaiting his first orbital spaceflight mission, Scobee served as an instructor pilot for the Shuttle's 747 carrier aircraft. In April 1984, he piloted Challenger mission STS-41-C, which successfully deployed one satellite and repaired another.

== Early life ==
Scobee was born May 19, 1939, in Cle Elum, Washington. He attended Washington Elementary School, Cascade Jr. High School, and Auburn Senior High School, from which he graduated in 1957.

== Air Force service ==
Scobee enlisted in the United States Air Force in 1957, where he served as a reciprocating engine mechanic at Kelly Air Force Base in San Antonio, Texas. While off duty, Scobee attended San Antonio College, and eventually received a Bachelor of Science degree in Aerospace Engineering from the University of Arizona in 1965. He was a member of Tau Beta Pi.

In 1965, Scobee was awarded an officer's commission. Afterward, he attended flight school and earned his pilot wings in 1966, serving as a combat aviator in the Vietnam War. Scobee was awarded the Distinguished Flying Cross, the Air Medal, and other decorations.

After his tour of duty, Scobee attended the USAF Aerospace Research Pilot School (Class 71B) at Edwards Air Force Base, 100 miles north of Los Angeles, California. Upon graduation in 1972, he became an Air Force test pilot, logging thousands of hours of flight time in dozens of aircraft, including the Boeing 747, the experimental X-24B lifting body, the F-111 Aardvark, and the gigantic C-5 Galaxy.

== Challenger ==
Scobee was assigned commander for the ill-fated STS-51-L mission, after having previously flown Challenger in STS-41-C as a pilot. The mission, designed to deploy a satellite to study the approaching Halley's Comet and to inaugurate the Teacher in Space Project, was delayed numerous times due to bad weather and technical glitches. When the mission finally did lift off the pad, a solid rocket booster O-ring seal failure destroyed the shuttle 73 seconds into the flight, killing Scobee and the other six crew members; the disaster, viewed live on national television, prompted several days of national mourning, as well as a major shakeup at NASA. He died a lieutenant colonel. At T+68 into the mission, the CAPCOM Richard Covey informed the crew that they were "go at throttle up", and Scobee confirmed the call—his last recorded words were his response, "Roger, go at throttle up." The shuttle broke up at an altitude of 48,000 feet (14.6 km).

Some experts, including one of NASA's lead investigators, Robert Overmyer, who was closest to Scobee, believed most if not all of the crew were alive and possibly conscious during the entire descent until impact with the ocean. After the investigation, Overmyer stated, "I not only flew with Dick Scobee, we owned a plane together, and I know Scob did everything he could to save his crew. Scob fought for any and every edge to survive. He flew that ship without wings all the way down."

== Family ==
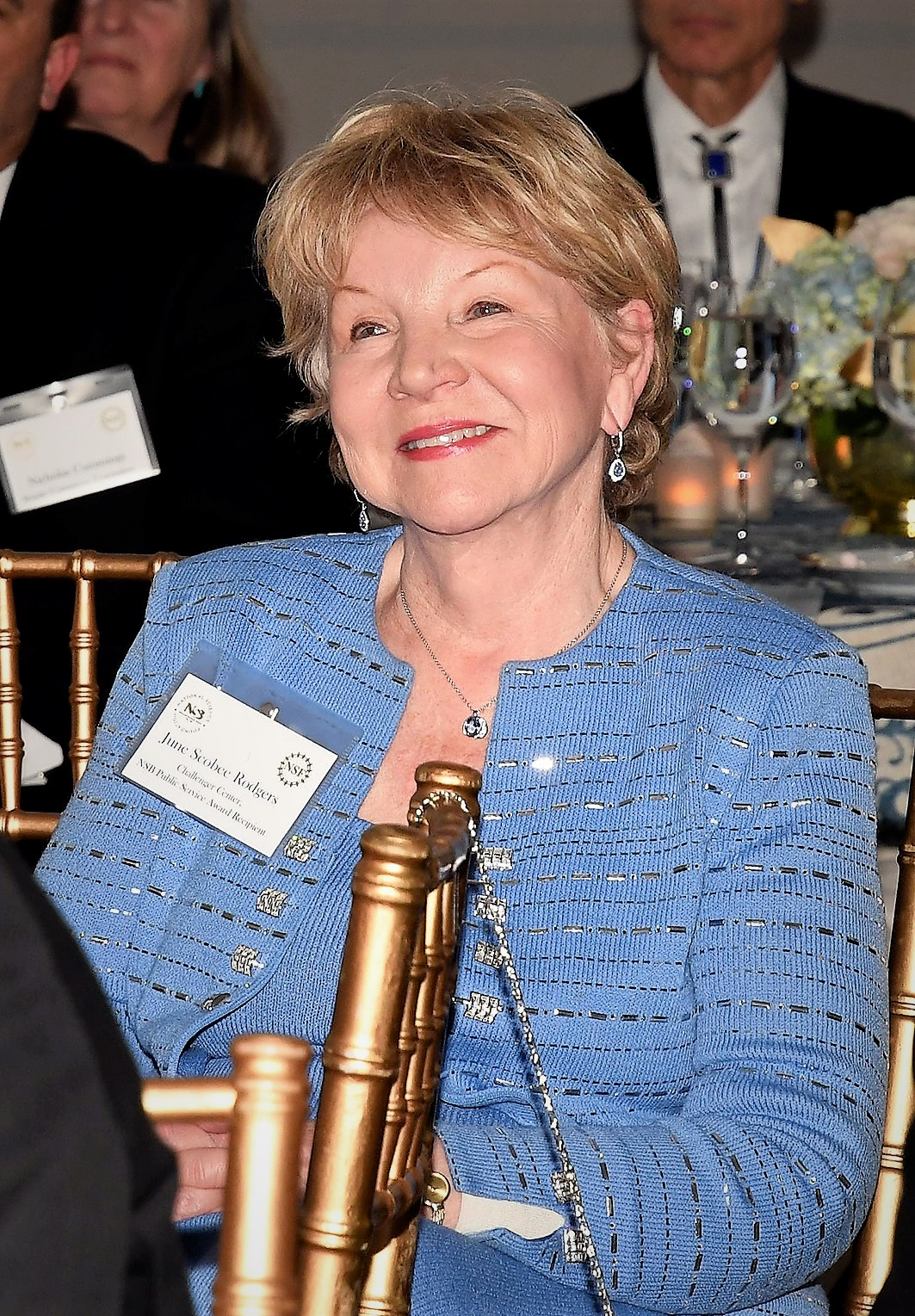
June Scobee Rodgers at 2017 National Science Board awards ceremony.

Scobee married Virginia June Kent (now June Scobee Rodgers; born November 30, 1942), with whom he had two children: Kathie R. Scobee Fulgham and Lieutenant General Richard W. Scobee, who graduated from the U.S. Air Force Academy, has flown F-16s for the USAF, and has commanded the 506th Air Expeditionary Group, 944th Fighter Wing, the 301st Fighter Wing, the 10th Air Force and U.S. Air Force Reserve Command. He led the military flyover during the pregame of Super Bowl XXX, which was played on the 10th anniversary of the disaster in 1996.

Dick Scobee is buried at Arlington National Cemetery. June remarried in 1989 to retired Army LTG Don Rodgers.

== Awards and recognition ==
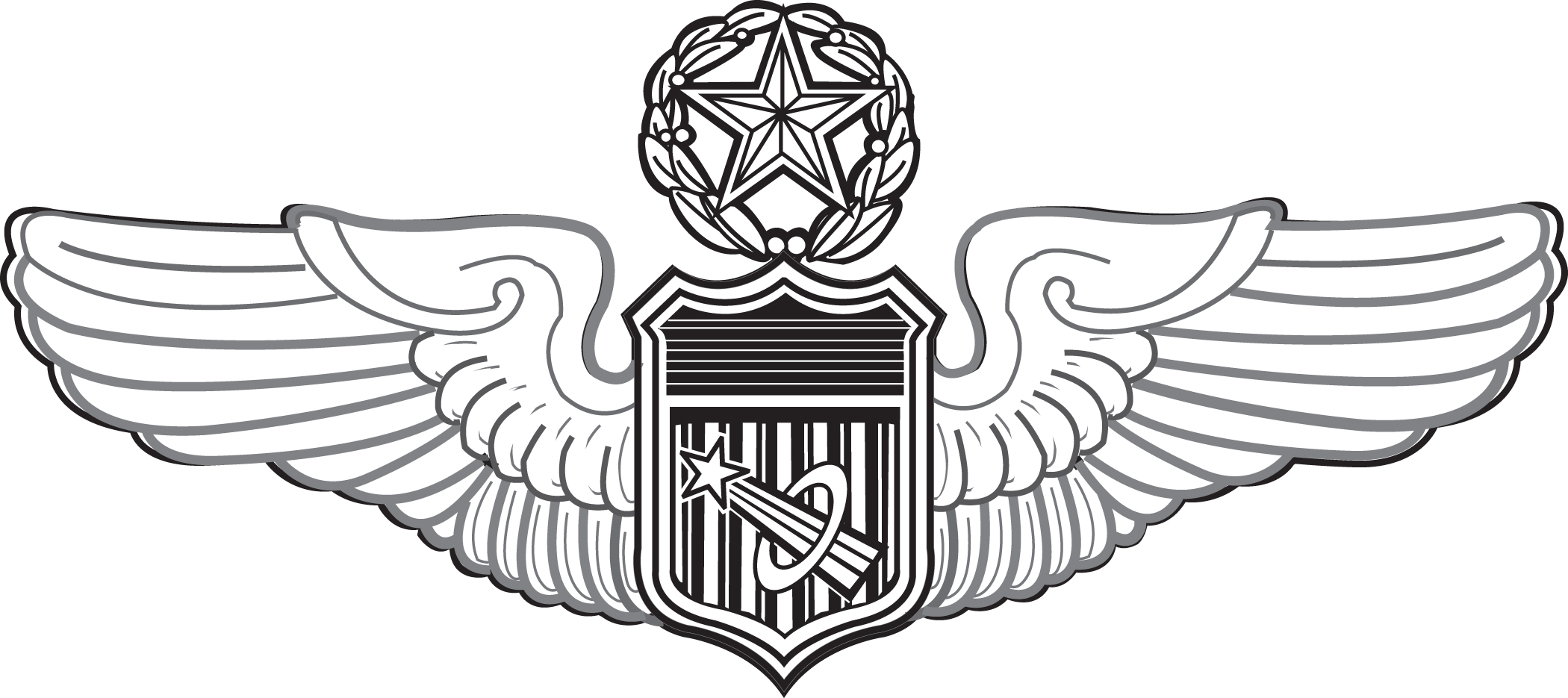

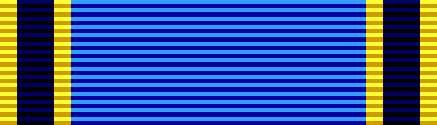

Air Force Command Pilot Badge with Astronaut Device
Distinguished Flying Cross
Meritorious Service Medal	Air Medal	Air Force Presidential Unit Citation
Air Force Outstanding Unit Award with four bronze oak leaf clusters	Congressional Space Medal of Honor	NASA Exceptional Service Medal
NASA Exceptional Achievement Medal with bronze oak leaf cluster	Air Force Good Conduct Medal	Army Good Conduct Medal
National Defense Service Medal with one star	Armed Forces Expeditionary Medal	Vietnam Service Medal with silver and bronze campaign stars
Air Force Longevity Service Award with four bronze oak leaf clusters	Small Arms Expert Marksmanship Ribbon	Republic of Vietnam Campaign Medal

On July 9, 1994, the San Antonio College Planetarium was rededicated The Scobee Planetarium. In 2004, Scobee was posthumously awarded the Congressional Space Medal of Honor and was inducted into the Astronaut Hall of Fame. After the Challenger disaster, a number of schools, streets, and municipal facilities in the U.S. were renamed in his honor. North Auburn Elementary School in Auburn, WA was renamed Dick Scobee Elementary, and Auburn Municipal Airport became Dick Scobee Field. Dick Scobee Memorial Airfield is a radio-controlled and model aircraft facility located at George Bush Park in western Harris County, Texas.

Scobee Road in Myrtle Beach, South Carolina, along with Ronald McNair Boulevard and Christa McAuliffe Street, commemorate Scobee and his fellow Challenger crew members. In Houston, Texas's George Bush Park, there is a R/C (Remote Controlled) Flying Field named in Scobee’s honor. He was portrayed by Barry Bostwick in the 1990 TV film Challenger. Scobee also made an appearance in the 1985 IMAX documentary The Dream is Alive, shot during the STS-41C mission. In April 1986, Dick Scobee Elementary School (formerly known as North Auburn Elementary School) in the Auburn School District was dedicated in a ceremony attended by his spouse, June. The Cygnus NG-21 spacecraft was named S.S. Francis R. "Dick" Scobee in his memory.
