= Space Shuttle Challenger disaster =

1986 American crewed rocket launch accident

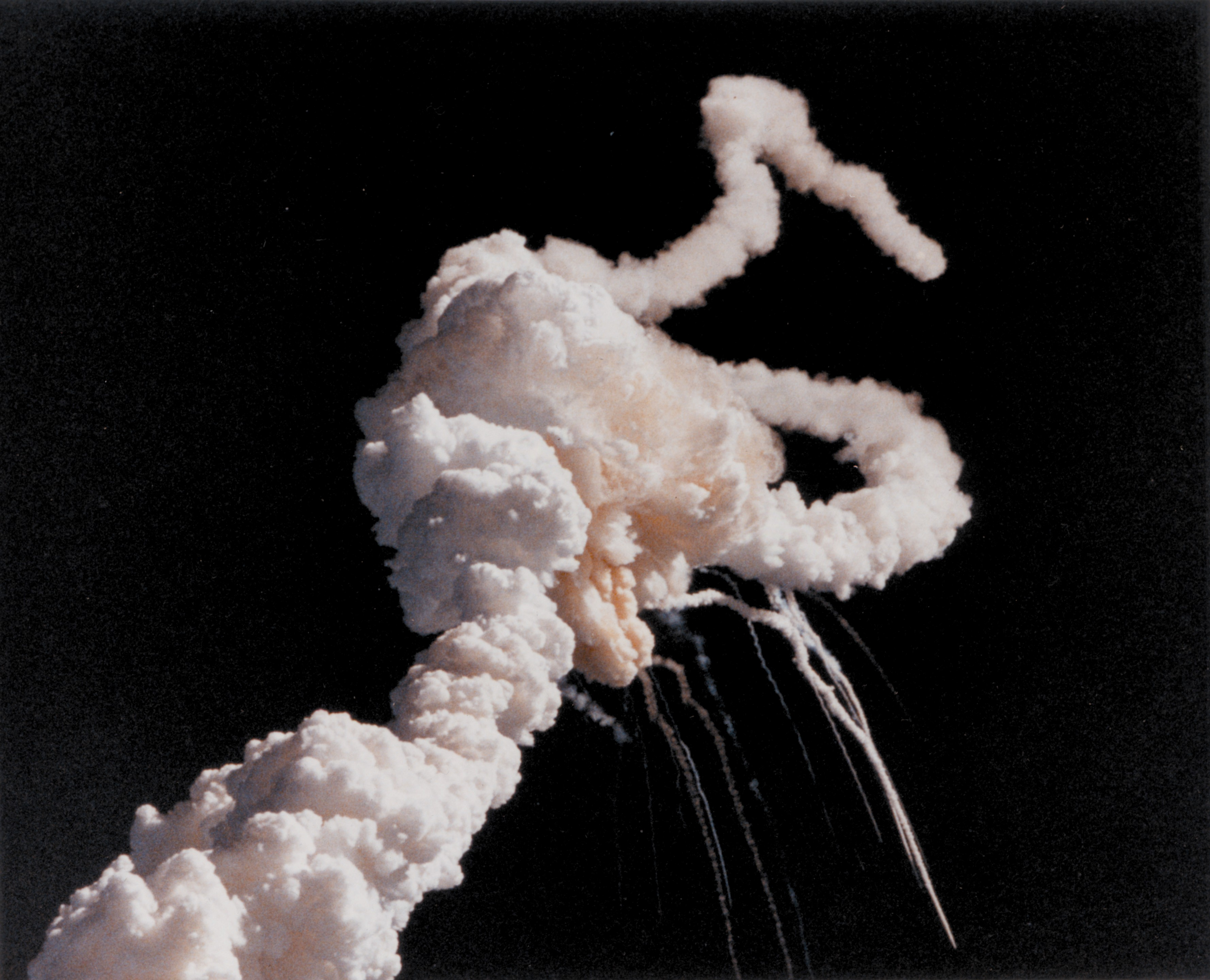
- Challenger's solid rocket boosters fly uncontrollably after the breakup of the external tank separated them from the shuttle stack. The remains of the orbiter and tank leave thin white trails as they fall toward the Atlantic Ocean.
- Date: January 28, 1986; 40 years ago
- Time: 16:39:13 UTC (11:39:13 EST)
- Location: Atlantic Ocean, off the coast of Florida; 28°38′24″N 80°16′48″W
- Cause: O-ring seal failure in right SRB due to cold weather and wind shear
- Outcome: Loss of Challenger and crew; Teacher in Space Project and subsequent civilian shuttle spaceflights cancelled; Shuttle fleet grounded for implementation of safety measures; Construction of replacement orbiter Endeavour; Second disaster with Space Shuttle Columbia
- Deaths: Dick Scobee, commander; Michael J. Smith, pilot; Ronald McNair, mission specialist; Ellison Onizuka, mission specialist; Judith Resnik, mission specialist; Gregory Jarvis, payload specialist; Christa McAuliffe, payload specialist, teacher
- Inquiries: Rogers Commission Report

On January 28, 1986, Space Shuttle Challenger broke apart 73 seconds into its flight, killing all seven crew members. The spacecraft disintegrated about 46,000 feet (14 km) above the Atlantic Ocean, off the coast of Cape Canaveral, Florida, at 16:39:13 UTC (11:39:13 a.m. EST, local time at the launch site). It was the first fatal accident involving an American spacecraft while in flight.

The mission, designated STS-51-L, was the 10th flight for the orbiter and the 25th flight of the NASA's Space Shuttle program. The crew was scheduled to deploy a commercial communications satellite and study Halley's Comet while they were in orbit, in addition to taking schoolteacher Christa McAuliffe into space under the Teacher in Space Project. This latter task resulted in a higher-than-usual media interest in and coverage of the mission, and the launch and subsequent disaster were seen live in many schools across the United States.

The cause of the disaster was the failure of the primary and secondary O-ring seals in a joint in the right Space Shuttle Solid Rocket Booster (SRB). The record-low temperatures on the morning of the launch had stiffened the rubber O-rings, reducing their ability to seal the joints. Shortly after liftoff the seals were breached, and hot pressurized gas from within the SRB leaked through the joint and burned through the aft attachment strut connecting it to the external propellant tank (ET), then into the tank itself. The collapse of the ET's internal structures and the rotation of the SRB that followed propelled the shuttle stack, traveling at a speed of Mach 1.92, into a direction that allowed aerodynamic forces to tear the orbiter apart. Both SRBs detached from the now-destroyed ET and continued to fly uncontrollably until the range safety officer (RSO) sent a signal to destroy them. The orbiter had no launch escape system.

The crew compartment containing human remains, and many other fragments from the shuttle, were recovered from the ocean floor during a three-month search and recovery operation. The exact timing of the deaths of the crew is not known, but several crew members are thought to have survived the initial breakup of the spacecraft. The impact of the crew compartment with the ocean surface at terminal velocity of 207 mph (333 km/h), with estimated deceleration of 200g, was too violent for human beings to survive.

The disaster resulted in a 32-month hiatus in the Space Shuttle program. President Ronald Reagan created the Rogers Commission to investigate the accident. The commission criticized NASA's organizational culture and decision-making processes that had contributed to the accident. Test data since 1977 had demonstrated a potentially catastrophic flaw in the SRBs' O-rings, but neither NASA nor SRB manufacturer Morton Thiokol had addressed this known defect. NASA managers also disregarded engineers' warnings about the dangers of launching in low temperatures, and they did not report these warnings to their superiors.

As a result of this disaster, NASA established the Office of Safety, Reliability, and Quality Assurance, and arranged for deployment of commercial satellites from expendable launch vehicles, rather than from a crewed orbiter. The construction of a new Space Shuttle orbiter, Endeavour, was approved in 1987 to replace Challenger, and the new orbiter first flew in 1992. Subsequent missions were launched with redesigned SRBs and their crews wore pressurized suits during ascent and reentry. In February 2003 the Space Shuttle Columbia disintegrated during re-entry. The Columbia Accident Investigation Board concluded that NASA had failed to learn lessons from the Challenger disaster, which resulted in the second disaster.

== Background ==
=== Space Shuttle ===
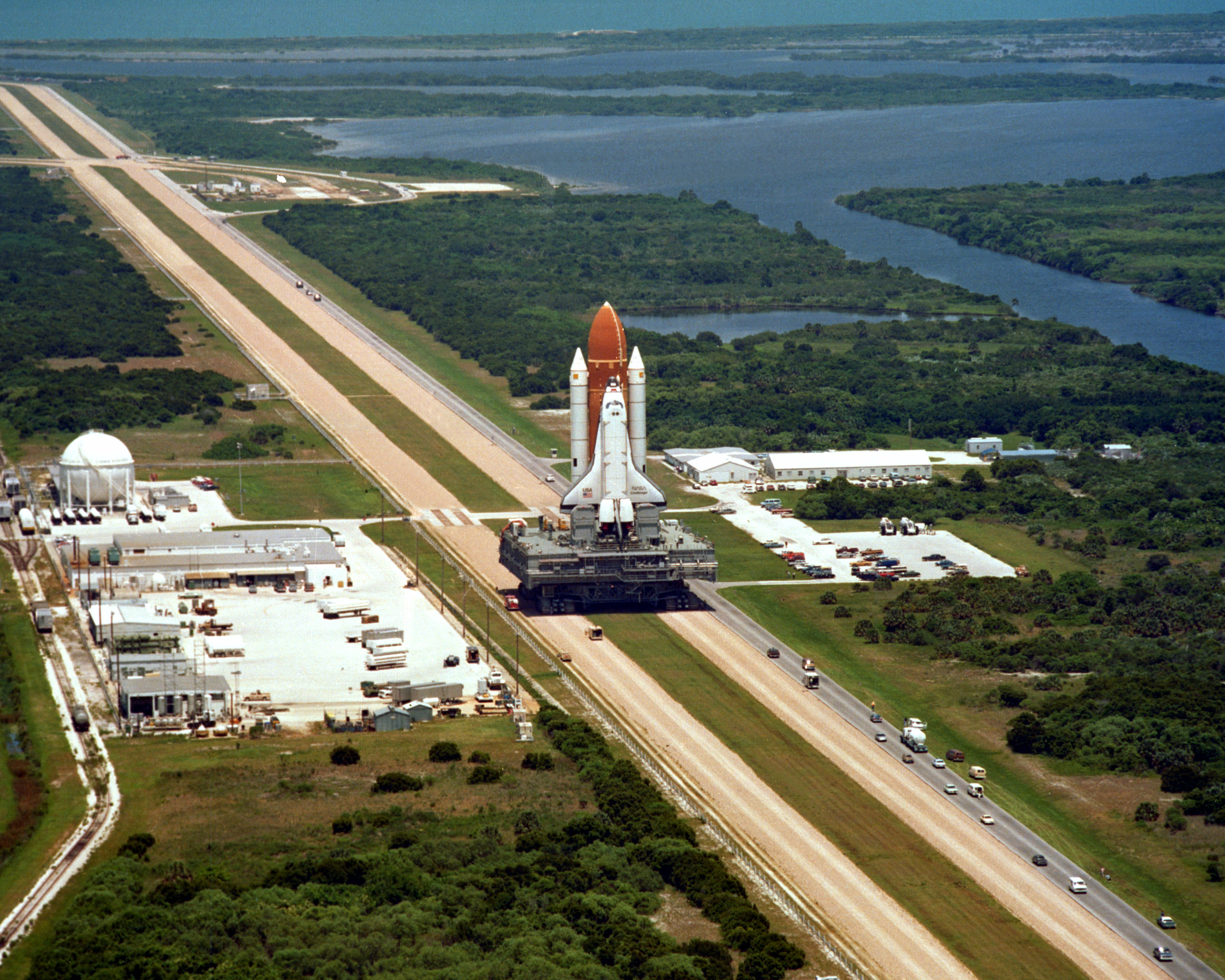
Space Shuttle Challenger – assembled for launch along with the ET and two SRBs – atop a crawler-transporter en route to the launch pad about one month before the disaster

The Space Shuttle was a partially reusable spacecraft operated by the US National Aeronautics and Space Administration (NASA). It flew for the first time in April 1981, and was used to conduct in-orbit research, and deploy commercial, military, and scientific payloads. At launch, it consisted of the orbiter, which contained the crew and payload, the external tank (ET), and the two solid rocket boosters (SRBs). The orbiter was a reusable, winged vehicle that launched vertically and landed as a glider. Five orbiters were built during the Space Shuttle program. Challenger (OV-099) was the second orbiter constructed after its conversion from a structural test article. The orbiter contained the crew compartment, where the crew predominantly lived and worked throughout a mission. Three Space Shuttle main engines (SSMEs) were mounted at the aft end of the orbiter and provided thrust during launch. Once in space, the crew maneuvered using the two smaller, aft-mounted Orbital Maneuvering System (OMS) engines.

When it launched, the orbiter was connected to the ET, which held the fuel for the SSMEs. The ET consisted of a larger tank for liquid hydrogen (LH2) and a smaller tank for liquid oxygen (LOX), both of which were required for the SSMEs to operate. After its fuel had been expended, the ET separated from the orbiter and reentered the atmosphere, where it would break apart during reentry and its pieces would land in the Indian or Pacific Ocean.

Two solid rocket boosters (SRBs), built by Morton Thiokol at the time of the disaster, provided the majority of thrust at liftoff. They were connected to the external tank, and burned for the first two minutes of flight. The SRBs separated from the orbiter once they had expended their fuel and fell into the Atlantic Ocean under a parachute. NASA retrieval teams recovered the SRBs and returned them to the Kennedy Space Center (KSC), where they were disassembled and their components were reused on future flights.

Each SRB was constructed in four main sections at the factory in Utah and transported to KSC, then assembled in the Vehicle Assembly Building at KSC with three tang-and-clevis field joints, each joint consisting of a tang from the upper segment fitting into the clevis of the lower segment. Each field joint was sealed with two 20-foot (6 m) diameter Viton-rubber O-rings around the circumference of the SRB and had a cross-section diameter of 0.280 inches (7.1 mm). The O-rings were required to contain the hot, high-pressure gases produced by the burning solid propellant and allowed for the SRBs to be rated for crewed missions. The two O-rings were configured to create a double bore seal, and the gap between segments was filled with putty. When the motor was running, this configuration was designed to compress air in the gap against the upper O-ring, pressing it against the sealing surfaces of its seat. On the SRB Critical Items List, the O-rings were listed as Criticality 1R, which indicated that an O-ring failure could result in the destruction of the vehicle and loss of life, and that it was considered a redundant system due to the secondary O-ring.

=== O-ring concerns ===
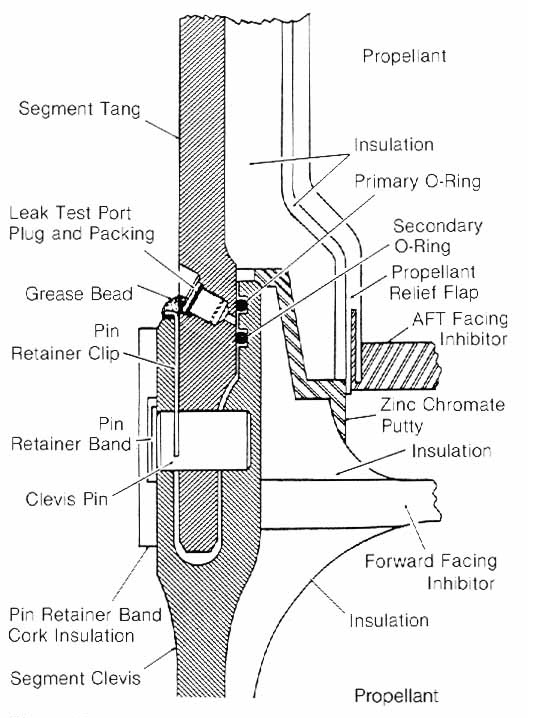
Cross-sectional diagram of the original SRB field joint. The top end of the lower rocket segment has a deep U-shaped cavity, or clevis, along its circumference. The bottom end of the top segment extends to form a tang that fits snugly into the clevis of the bottom segment. Two parallel grooves near the top of the clevis inner branch hold ~20 foot (6 meter) diameter O-rings that seal the gap between the tang and the clevis, keeping hot gases out of the gap.

Diagram of Space Shuttle Challenger solid rocket booster, showing location of the O-ring that failed during launch.

Evaluations of the proposed SRB design in the early 1970s and field joint testing showed that the wide tolerances between the mated parts allowed the O-rings to be extruded from their seats rather than compressed. This extrusion was judged to be acceptable by NASA and Morton Thiokol despite concerns of NASA's engineers. A 1977 test showed that up to 0.052 inches (1.3 mm) of joint rotation occurred during the simulated internal pressure of a launch. Joint rotation, which occurred when the tang and clevis bent away from each other, reduced the pressure on the O-rings, which weakened their seals and made it possible for combustion gases to erode the O-rings. NASA engineers suggested that the field joints should be redesigned to include shims around the O-rings, but they received no response. In 1980, the NASA Verification/Certification Committee requested further tests on joint integrity to include testing in the temperature range of 40 to 90 °F (4 to 32 °C) and with only a single O-ring installed. The NASA program managers decided that their current level of testing was sufficient and further testing was not required. In December 1982, the Critical Items List was updated to indicate that the secondary O-ring could not provide a backup to the primary O-ring, as it would not necessarily form a seal in the event of joint rotation. The O-rings were redesignated as Criticality 1, removing the "R" to indicate it was no longer considered a redundant system.

The first occurrence of in-flight O-ring erosion occurred on the right SRB on STS-2 in November 1981. In August 1984, a post-flight inspection of the left SRB on STS-41-D revealed that soot had blown past the primary O-ring and was found in between the O-rings. Although there was no damage to the secondary O-ring, this indicated that the primary O-ring was not creating a reliable seal and was allowing hot gas to pass. The amount of O-ring erosion was insufficient to prevent the O-ring from sealing, and investigators concluded that the soot between the O-rings resulted from non-uniform pressure at the time of ignition. The January 1985 launch of STS-51-C was the coldest Space Shuttle launch to date. The air temperature was 62 °F (17 °C) at the time of launch, and the calculated O-ring temperature was 53 °F (12 °C). Post-flight analysis revealed erosion in primary O-rings in both SRBs. Morton Thiokol engineers determined that the cold temperatures caused a loss of flexibility in the O-rings that decreased their ability to seal the field joints, which allowed hot gas and soot to flow past the primary O-ring. O-ring erosion occurred on all but one (STS-51-J) of the Space Shuttle flights in 1985, and erosion of both the primary and secondary O-rings occurred on STS-51-B.

To correct the issues with O-ring erosion, engineers at Morton Thiokol, led by Allan McDonald and Roger Boisjoly, proposed a redesigned field joint that introduced a metal lip to limit movement in the joint. They also recommended adding a spacer to provide additional thermal protection and using an O-ring with a larger cross section. In July 1985, Morton Thiokol ordered redesigned SRB casings, with the intention of using already-manufactured casings for the upcoming launches until the redesigned cases were available the following year.

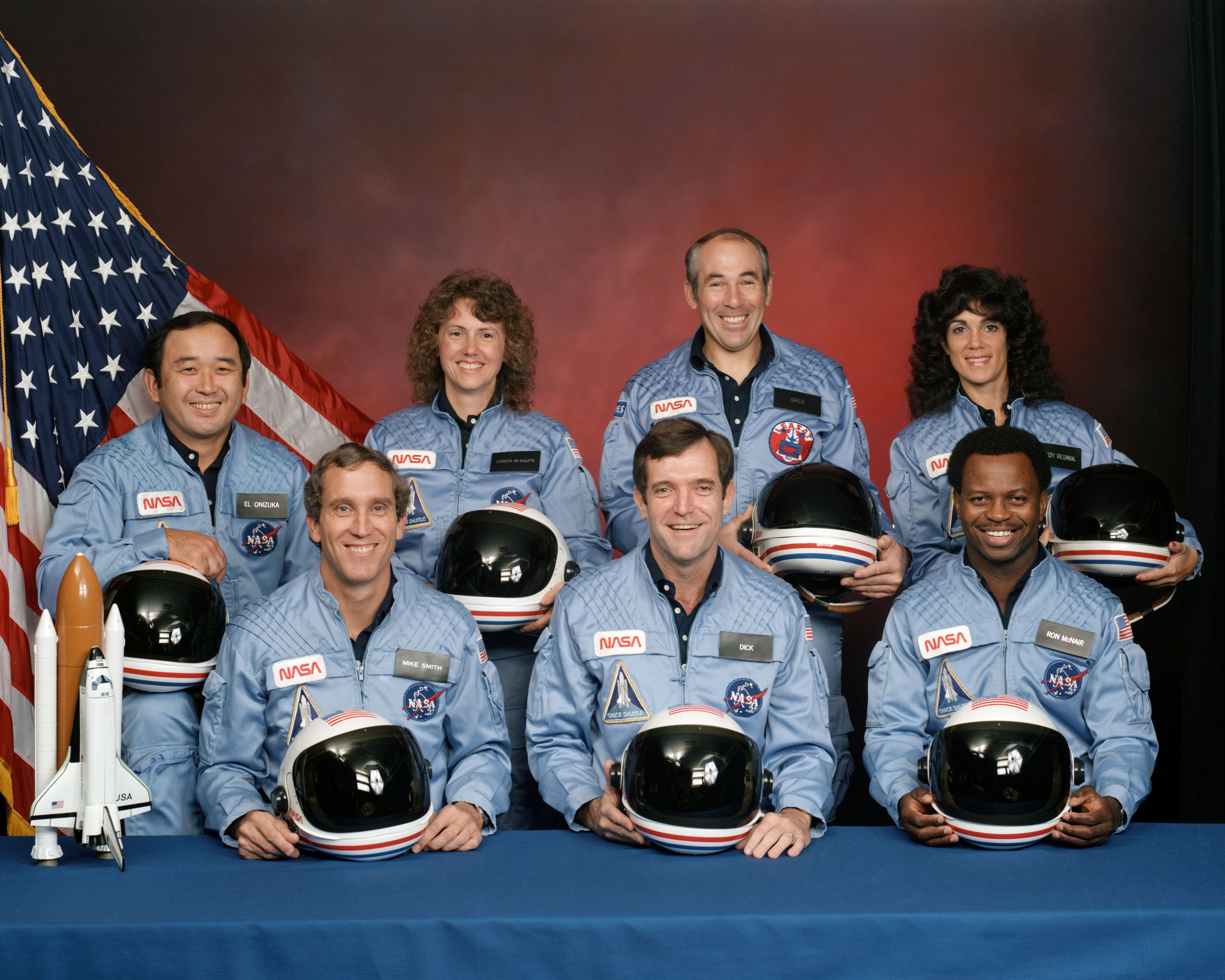
STS-51-L crew: (back) Onizuka, McAuliffe, Jarvis, Resnik; (front) Smith, Scobee, McNair.

=== Mission ===
The Space Shuttle mission, named STS-51-L, was the twenty-fifth Space Shuttle flight and the tenth flight of Challenger. The crew was announced on January 27, 1985, and was commanded by Dick Scobee. Michael Smith was assigned as the pilot, and the mission specialists were Ellison Onizuka, Judith Resnik, and Ronald McNair. The two payload specialists were Gregory Jarvis, who was assigned to conduct research for the Hughes Aircraft Company, and Christa McAuliffe, who flew as part of the Teacher in Space Project.

The primary mission of the Challenger crew was to use an Inertial Upper Stage (IUS) to deploy TDRS-B, a tracking and data relay satellite. The crew also planned to study Halley's Comet as it passed near the Sun, and deploy and retrieve the Spartan Halley satellite.

The mission was originally scheduled for July 1985, but was delayed to November and then to January 1986. The launch date was initially set for January 22, but this was delayed several times while the shuttle waited on the launch pad.

On December 23, 1985, due to delays in preparations for STS-61-C, the launch was pushed back to January 23. On January 22, the mission was postponed until January 26 due to dust storms at the shuttle's emergency landing site, Dakar-Yoff International Airport in Senegal. NASA chose Mohammed V International Airport in Casablanca, Morocco, as an alternative emergency site, but a lack of runway lighting there meant that the shuttle now could only launch when it was daytime in Morocco and morning in Florida. The launch was postponed again by one day when thunderstorms near Cape Canaveral were forecast for January 26; the weather turned out to be clear at the intended launch time, but storms came in shortly thereafter. The shuttle was prepared to launch on January 27, but the countdown was halted at T−9 minutes when the crew cabin's door handle could not be removed due to a stuck bolt, preventing the needed insulation tile from being installed in its place. By the time the bolt had been removed, high winds at Cape Canaveral prevented the launch, as they would have made a RTLS abort dangerous if it were needed. The winds continued until the morning's launch window closed at 12:37 p.m. EST, causing one final postponement to January 28.

While all of these delays were necessitated by safety concerns, the increased publicity surrounding the mission because of the Teacher in Space Program led major media outlets to ridicule the repeated postponements of the launch. On the evening of January 27, CBS's Dan Rather called the bolt issue a "high-tech low comedy", while other outlets highlighted the frustration of spectators who had been waiting for the launch that day. This negative media coverage was later cited as one of several factors which pressured NASA officials to ignore potential issues with the O-rings so that Challenger could launch as soon as possible.

== Decision to launch ==
The air temperature on January 28 was predicted to be a record low for a Space Shuttle launch. The air temperature was forecast to drop to 18 °F (−8 °C) overnight before rising to 22 °F (−6 °C) at 6:00 a.m. and 26 °F (−3 °C) at the scheduled launch time of 9:38 a.m. Based upon O-ring erosion that had occurred in warmer launches, Morton Thiokol engineers were concerned over the effect the record-cold temperatures would have on the seal provided by the SRB O-rings for the launch. Cecil Houston, the manager of the Kennedy Space Center (KSC) office of the Marshall Space Flight Center in Alabama, set up a three-way conference call with Morton Thiokol in Utah and the KSC in Florida on the evening of January 27 to discuss the safety of the launch. Morton Thiokol engineers expressed their concerns about the effect of low temperatures on the resilience of the rubber O-rings. As the colder temperatures lowered the elasticity of the rubber O-rings, the engineers feared that the O-rings would not be extruded to form a seal at the time of launch. The engineers argued that they did not have enough data to determine whether the O-rings would seal at temperatures colder than 53 °F (12 °C), the coldest launch of the Space Shuttle to date. During this discussion, Lawrence Mulloy, the NASA SRB project manager, said that he did not accept the analysis behind this decision, and demanded to know if Morton Thiokol expected him to wait until April for warmer temperatures. Morton Thiokol employees Robert Lund, the Vice President of Engineering, and Joe Kilminster, the Vice President of the Space Booster Programs, recommended against launching until the temperature was above 53 °F (12 °C).

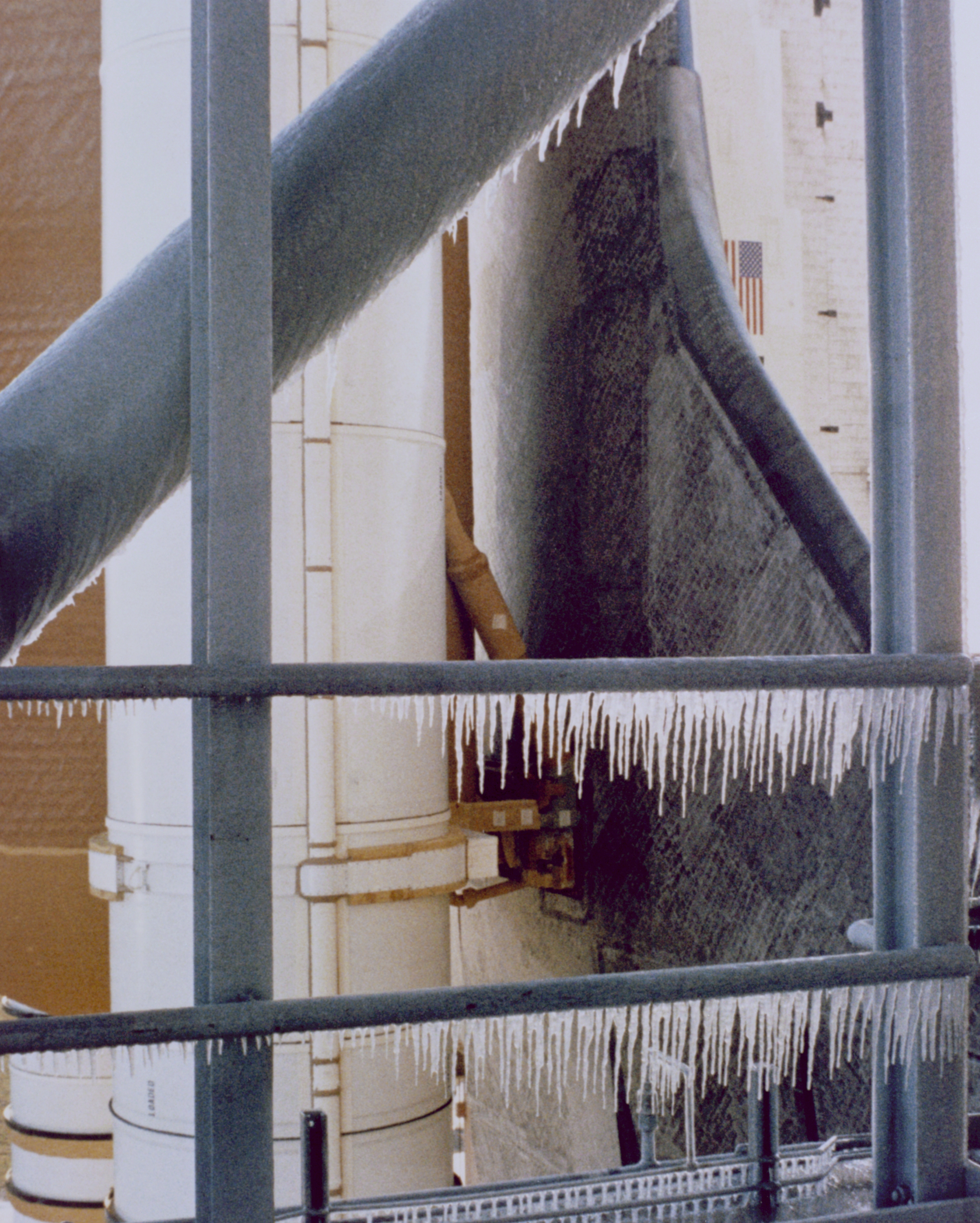
Ice on the launch tower hours before Challenger launch

When the teleconference prepared to hold a recess to allow for private discussion amongst Morton Thiokol management, Allan J. McDonald, Morton Thiokol's Director of the Space Shuttle SRM Project who was sitting at the KSC end of the call, reminded his colleagues in Utah to examine the interaction between delays in the primary O-rings sealing relative to the ability of the secondary O-rings to provide redundant backup, believing this would add enough to the engineering analysis to get Mulloy to stop accusing the engineers of using inconclusive evidence to try and delay the launch. When the call resumed, Morton Thiokol leadership had changed their opinion and stated that the evidence presented on the failure of the O-rings was inconclusive and that there was a substantial margin in the event of a failure or erosion. They stated that their decision was to proceed with the launch. When McDonald told Mulloy that, as the onsite representative at KSC he would not sign off on the decision, Mulloy demanded that Morton Thiokol provide a signed recommendation to launch; Kilminster confirmed that he would sign it and fax it from Utah immediately, and the teleconference ended. Mulloy called Arnold Aldrich, the NASA Mission Management Team Leader, to discuss the launch decision and weather concerns, but did not mention the O-ring discussion; the two agreed to proceed with the launch.

An overnight measurement taken by the KSC Ice Team recorded the left SRB was 25 °F (−4 °C) and the right SRB was 8 °F (−13 °C). These measurements were recorded for engineering data and not reported, because the temperature of the SRBs was not part of the Launch Commit Criteria. In addition to its effect on the O-rings, the cold temperatures caused ice to form on the fixed service structure. To keep pipes from freezing, water was slowly run from the system; it could not be entirely drained because of the upcoming launch. As a result, ice formed from 240 feet (73 m) down in the freezing temperatures. Engineers at Rockwell International, which manufactured the orbiter, were concerned that ice would be violently thrown during launch and could potentially damage the orbiter's thermal protection system or be aspirated into one of the engines. Rocco Petrone, the head of Rockwell's space transportation division, and his team determined that the potential damage from ice made the mission unsafe to fly. Arnold Aldrich consulted with engineers at KSC and the Johnson Space Center (JSC) who advised him that ice did not threaten the safety of the orbiter, and he decided to proceed with the launch. The launch was delayed for an additional hour to allow more ice to melt. The ice team performed an inspection at T−20 minutes which indicated that the ice was melting, and Challenger was cleared to launch at 11:38 a.m. EST, with an air temperature of 36 °F (2 °C).

== Launch and failure ==
=== Liftoff and initial ascent ===
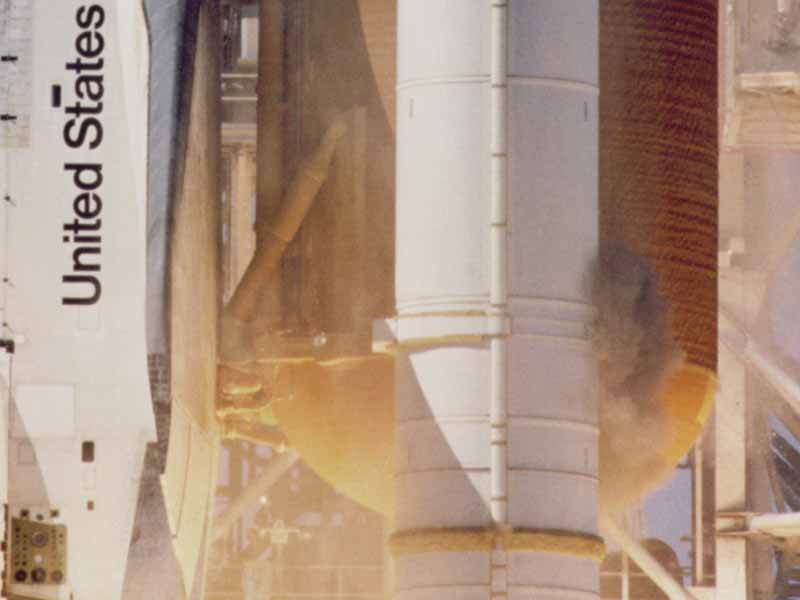
Gray smoke escaping from the right-side solid rocket booster

At T+0, Challenger launched from the Kennedy Space Center Launch Complex 39B (LC-39B) at 11:38:00 a.m. Beginning at T+0.678 until T+3.375 seconds, nine puffs of dark gray smoke were recorded escaping from the right-hand SRB near the aft strut that attached the booster to the ET. It was later determined that these smoke puffs were caused by joint rotation in the aft field joint of the right-hand SRB at ignition.

The cold temperature in the joint had prevented the O-rings from creating a seal. Rainfall from the preceding time on the launchpad had likely accumulated within the field joint, further compromising the sealing capability of the O-rings. As a result, hot gas was able to travel past the O-rings and erode them. Molten aluminum oxides from the burned propellant unintentionally resealed the joint and created a temporary barrier against further hot gas and flame escaping through the field joint. The Space Shuttle main engines (SSMEs) were throttled down as scheduled for maximum dynamic pressure (max q). During its ascent, the Space Shuttle encountered wind shear conditions beginning at T+37, but they were within design limits of the vehicle and were countered by the guidance system.

=== Plume ===
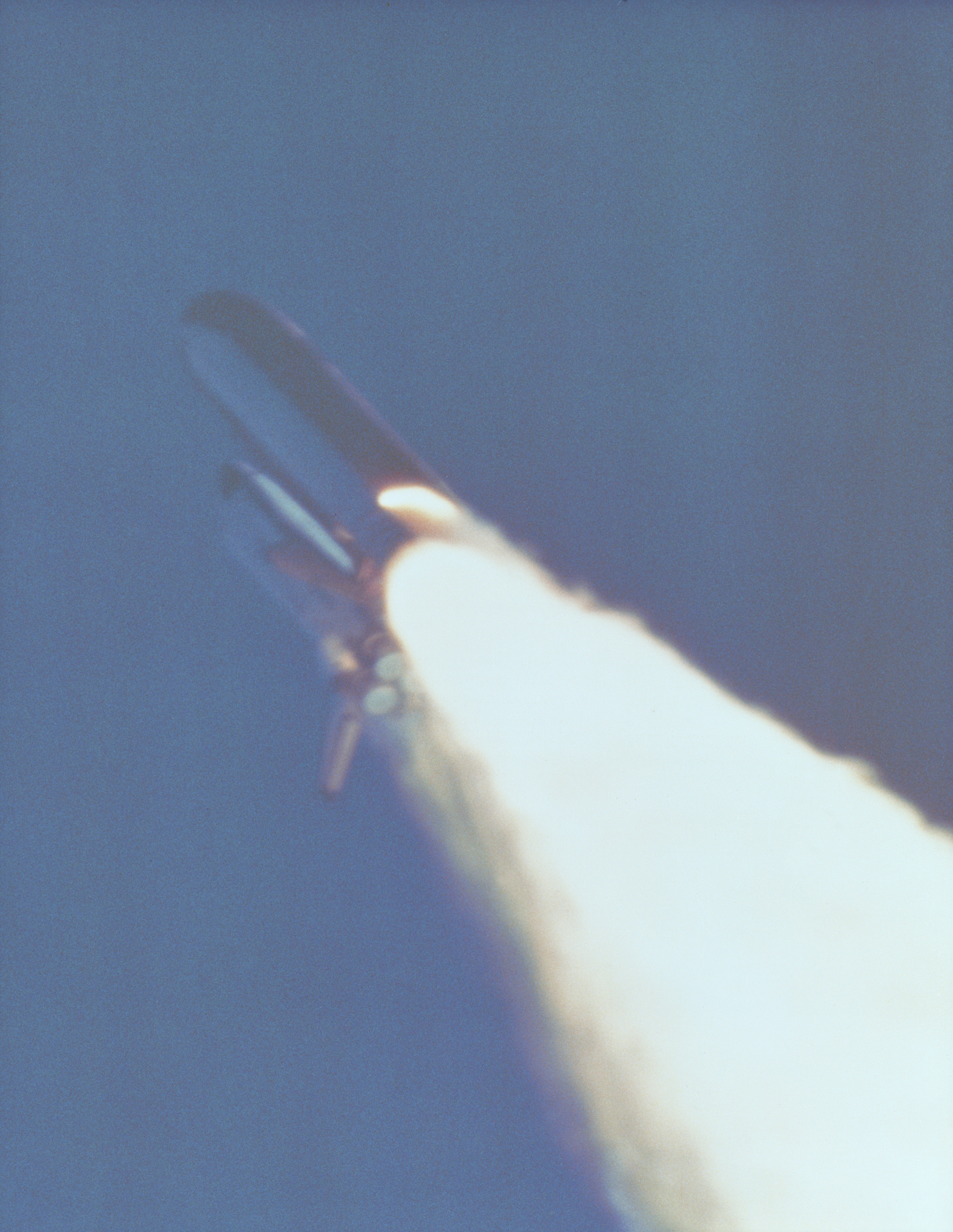
Plume on right SRB at T+58.788 seconds

At T+58.788, a tracking film camera captured the beginnings of a plume near the aft attach strut on the right SRB, right before the vehicle passed through max q at T+59.000. The high aerodynamic forces and wind shear likely broke the unintentional aluminum oxide seal that had replaced eroded O-rings, allowing the flame to burn through the joint. Within one second from when it was first recorded, the plume became well-defined, and the enlarging hole caused a drop in internal pressure in the right SRB. A leak had begun in the liquid hydrogen (LH2) tank of the ET at T+64.660, as indicated by the changing shape of the plume.

The SSMEs pivoted to compensate for the booster burn-through, which was creating an unexpected thrust on the vehicle. The pressure in the external LH2 tank began to drop at T+66.764 indicating that the flame had burned from the SRB into the tank. The crew and flight controllers made no indication they were aware of the vehicle and flight anomalies. At T+68, the CAPCOM, Richard O. Covey, told the crew, "Challenger, go at throttle up", indicating that the SSMEs had throttled up to 104% thrust. (Note: The RS-25 engines had several improvements to enhance reliability and power. During the development program, Rocketdyne determined that the engine was capable of safe, reliable operation at 104% of the originally specified thrust. To keep the engine thrust values consistent with previous documentation and software, NASA kept the originally specified thrust at 100%, but had the RS-25 operate at higher thrust.) In response to Covey, Scobee said, "Roger, go at throttle up"; this was the last communication from Challenger on the air-to-ground loop.

=== Vehicle breakup ===
The disintegration of Space Shuttle Challenger, taken from the TV-3 camera

At T+72.284, the right SRB pulled away from the aft strut that attached it to the ET, causing lateral acceleration that was felt by the crew. At the same time, pressure in the LH2 tank began dropping. Pilot Mike Smith said "Uh-oh", which was the last crew comment recorded. At T+73.124, white vapor was seen flowing away from the ET, after which the aft dome of the LH2 tank fell off. The resulting release and ignition of all liquid hydrogen in the tank pushed the LH2 tank forward into the liquid oxygen (LOX) tank with a force equating to roughly 3,000,000 pounds (13 MN), while the right SRB collided with the intertank structure. The failure of the LH2 and LOX tanks resulted in a boiling liquid expanding vapor explosion (BLEVE), with a large part of the liquid evaporating back into gas almost instantly.

These events resulted in an abrupt change to the shuttle stack's attitude and direction, which was shrouded from view by the vaporized contents of the now-destroyed ET. As it traveled at Mach 1.92, Challenger took aerodynamic forces it was not designed to withstand and broke into several large pieces: a wing, the (still firing) main engines, the crew cabin and hypergolic fuel leaking from the ruptured reaction control system were among the parts identified exiting the vapor cloud. The disaster unfolded at an altitude of 46,000 feet (14 km). Both SRBs survived the breakup of the shuttle stack and continued flying, now unguided by the attitude and trajectory control of their mothership, until their flight termination systems were activated at T+110.

=== Post-breakup flight controller dialogue ===
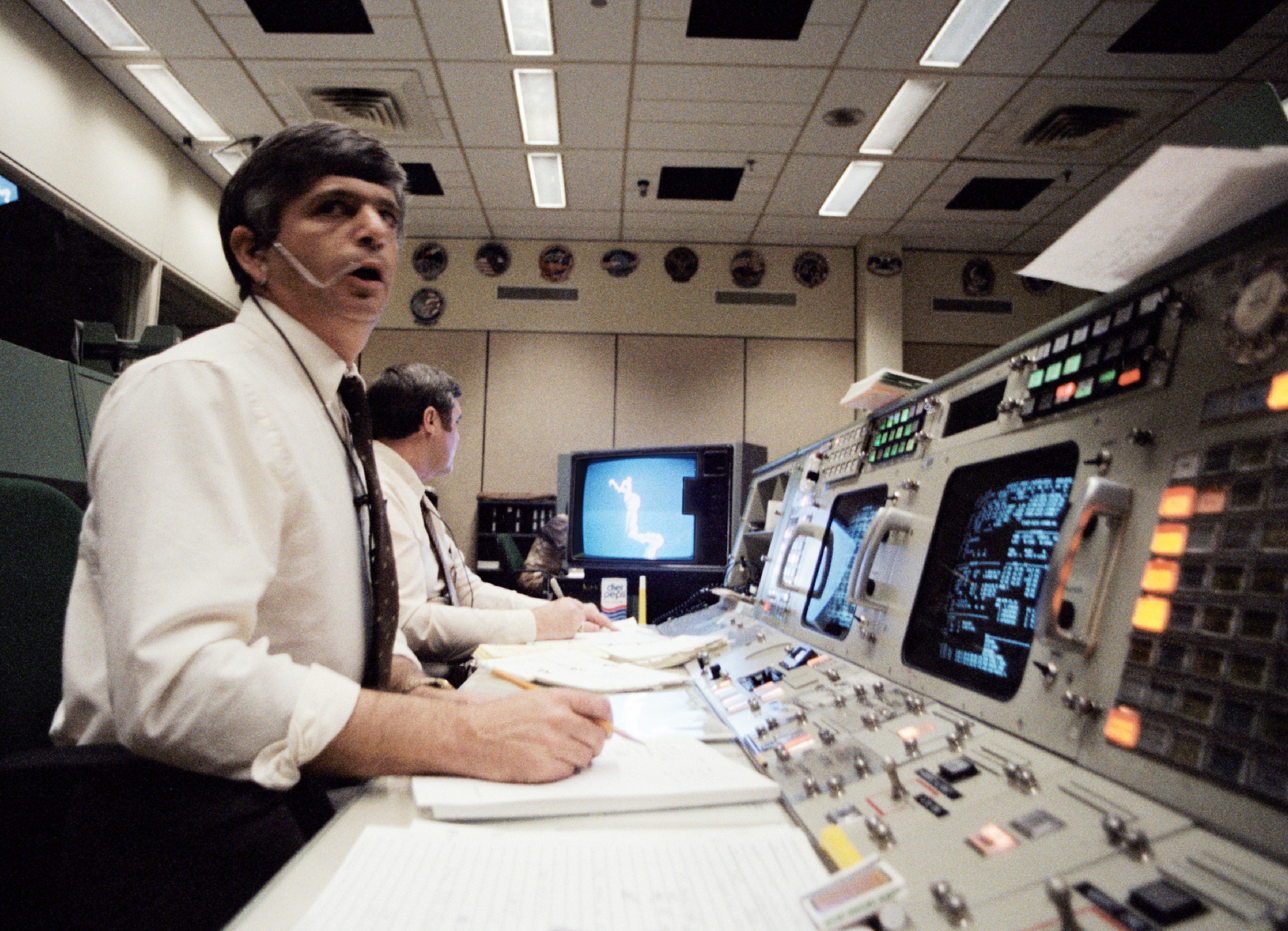
Jay Greene after Challenger's breakup

At T+73.191, there was a burst of static on the air-to-ground loop as the vehicle broke up, which was later attributed to ground-based radios searching for a signal from the destroyed spacecraft. NASA Public Affairs Officer Steve Nesbitt was initially unaware of the explosion and continued to read out flight information. At T+89, after video of the explosion was seen in Mission Control, the Ground Control Officer reported "negative contact (and) loss of downlink" as they were no longer receiving transmissions from Challenger. Nesbitt stated, "Flight controllers here are looking very carefully at the situation. Obviously a major malfunction. We have no downlink." Soon afterwards, he said, "We have a report from the Flight Dynamics Officer that the vehicle has exploded. The flight director confirms that. We are looking at checking with the recovery forces to see what can be done at this point."

In Mission Control, flight director Jay Greene ordered that contingency procedures be put into effect, which included locking the doors, shutting down telephone communications, and freezing computer terminals to collect data from them.

=== Cause and time of death ===
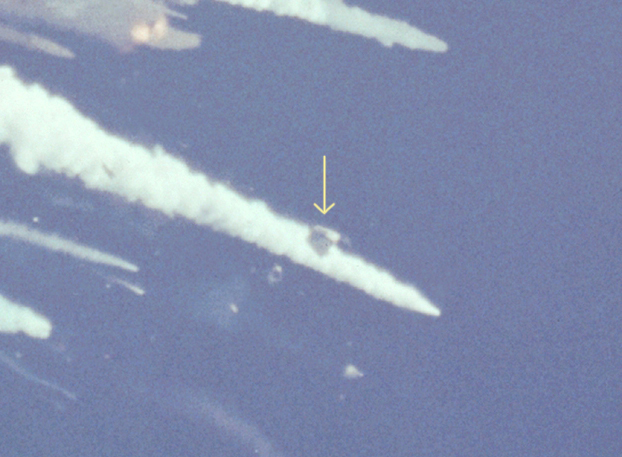
The forward section of the fuselage after breakup, indicated by the arrow

The crew cabin, which was made of reinforced aluminum, separated in one piece from the rest of the orbiter. It then traveled in a ballistic arc, reaching an apogee of 65,000 feet (20 km) approximately 25 seconds after the explosion. At the time of separation, the maximum acceleration is estimated to have been between 12 and 20 times that of gravity (g). Within two seconds it had dropped below 4 g, and within ten seconds the cabin was in free fall. The forces involved at this stage were probably insufficient to cause major injury to the crew.

At least some of the crew were alive and conscious after the breakup, as Personal Egress Air Packs (PEAPs) were activated for Smith and two unidentified crewmembers, but not for Scobee. The PEAPs were not intended for in-flight use, and the astronauts never trained with them for an in-flight emergency. The location of Smith's activation switch, on the back side of his seat, indicated that either Resnik or Onizuka likely activated it for him. Investigators found their remaining unused air supply consistent with the expected consumption during the post-breakup trajectory.

While analyzing the wreckage, investigators discovered that several electrical system switches on Smith's right-hand panel had been moved from their usual launch positions. The switches had lever locks on top of them that must be pulled out before the switch could be moved. Later tests established that neither the force of the explosion nor the impact with the ocean could have moved them, indicating that Smith made the switch changes, presumably in a futile attempt to restore electrical power to the cockpit after the crew cabin detached from the rest of the orbiter.

On July 28, 1986, NASA's Associate Administrator for Space Flight, former astronaut Richard H. Truly, released a report on the deaths of the crew from physician and Skylab 2 astronaut Joseph P. Kerwin:

The findings are inconclusive. The impact of the crew compartment with the ocean surface was so violent that evidence of damage occurring in the seconds which followed the disintegration was masked. Our final conclusions are:

- the cause of death of the Challenger astronauts cannot be positively determined;
- the forces to which the crew were exposed during Orbiter breakup were probably not sufficient to cause death or serious injury; and
- the crew possibly, but not certainly, lost consciousness in the seconds following Orbiter breakup due to in-flight loss of crew module pressure.

Pressurization could have enabled consciousness for the entire fall until impact. The crew cabin hit the ocean surface at 207 mph (333 km/h) approximately 2 minutes and 45 seconds after breakup. The estimated deceleration was 200 g, far exceeding structural limits of the crew compartment or crew survivability levels. The mid-deck floor had not suffered buckling or tearing, as would result from a rapid decompression, but stowed equipment showed damage consistent with decompression, and debris was embedded between the two forward windows that may have caused a loss of pressure. Impact damage to the crew cabin was severe enough that it could not be determined whether the crew cabin had previously been damaged enough to lose pressurization.

=== Prospect of crew escape ===
Unlike other spacecraft, the Space Shuttle did not allow for crew escape during powered flight. Launch escape systems had been considered during development, but NASA's conclusion was that the Space Shuttle's expected high reliability would preclude the need for one. Modified SR-71 Blackbird ejection seats and full pressure suits were used for the two-person crews on the first four Space Shuttle orbital test flights, but they were disabled and later removed for the operational flights. Escape options for the operational flights were considered but not implemented due to their complexity, high cost, and heavy weight. After the disaster, a system was implemented to allow the crew to escape in gliding flight, but this system would not have been usable to escape an explosion during ascent.

== Recovery of debris and crew ==
Immediately after the disaster, the NASA Launch Recovery Director launched the two SRB recovery ships, MV Freedom Star and MV Liberty Star, to proceed to the impact area to recover debris, and requested the support of US military aircraft and ships. Owing to falling debris from the explosion, the Range Safety Officer (RSO) kept recovery forces from the impact area until 12:37 p.m. The size of the recovery operations increased to 12 aircraft and 8 ships by 7:00 p.m. Surface operations recovered debris from the orbiter and external tank. The surface recovery operations ended on February 7.

On January 31, the US Navy was tasked with submarine recovery operations. The search efforts prioritized the recovery of the right SRB, followed by the crew compartment, and then the remaining payload, orbiter pieces, and ET. The search for debris formally began on February 8 with the rescue and salvage ship USS Preserver, and eventually grew to sixteen ships, of which three were managed by NASA, four by the US Navy, one by the US Air Force and eight by independent contractors. The surface ships used side-scan sonar to make the initial search for debris and covered 486 square nautical miles (1,670 km^{2}) at water depths between 70 and 1,200 feet (20 and 370 m). The sonar operations discovered 881 potential locations for debris, of which 187 pieces were later confirmed to be from the orbiter.

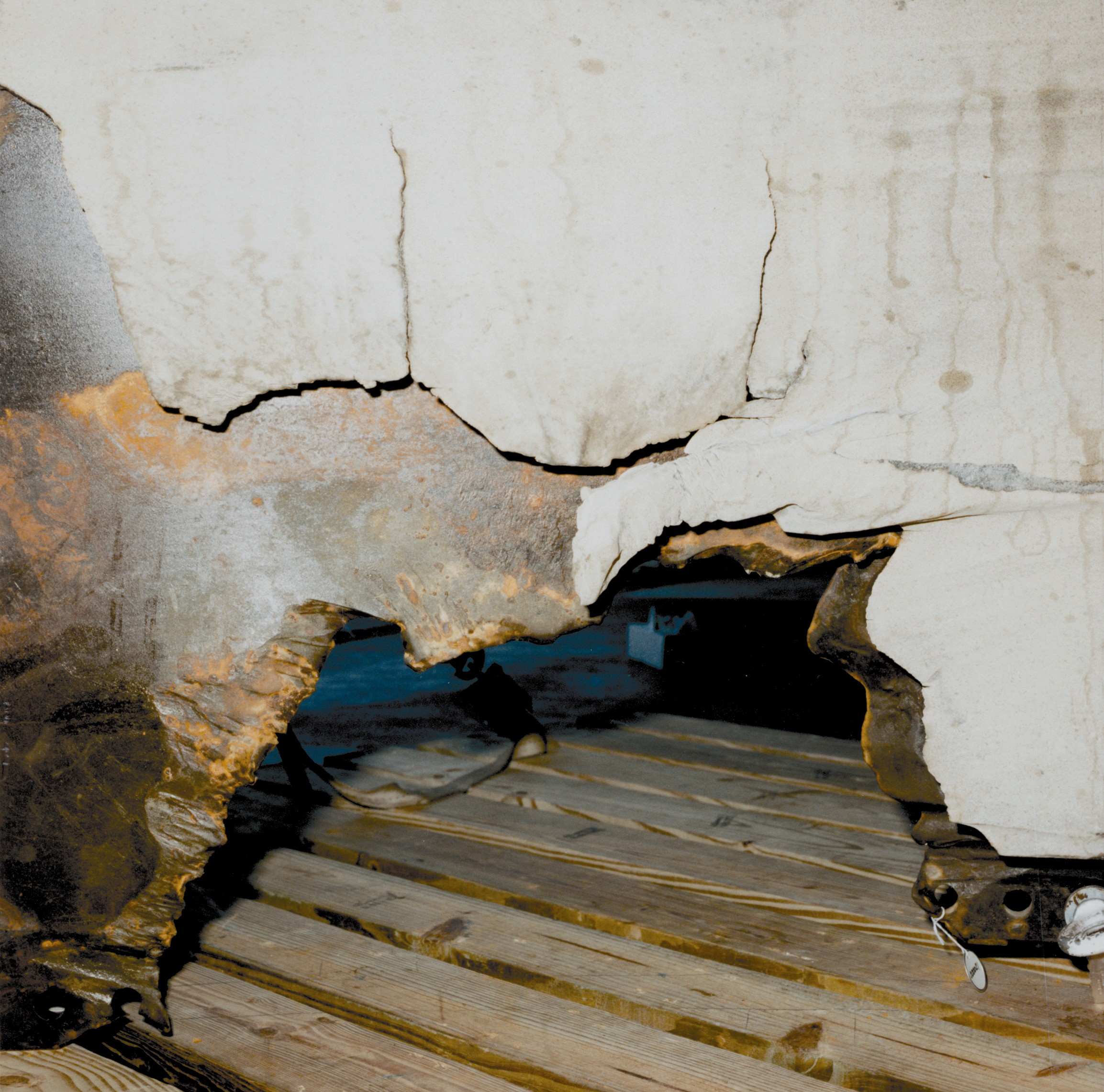
Right SRB debris showing the hole caused by the plume

The debris from the SRBs was widely distributed due to the detonation of their linear shaped charges. The identification of SRB material was primarily conducted by crewed submarines and submersibles. The vehicles were dispatched to investigate potential debris located during the search phase. Surface ships lifted the SRB debris with the help of technical divers and underwater remotely operated vehicles to attach the necessary slings to raise the debris with cranes. The solid propellant in the SRBs posed a risk, as it became more volatile after being submerged. Recovered portions of the SRBs were kept wet during recovery, and their unused propellant was ignited once they were brought ashore. The failed joint on the right SRB was first located on sonar on March 1. Subsequent dives to 560 ft (170 m) by the NR-1 submarine on April 5 and the SEA-LINK I submersible on April 12 confirmed that it was the damaged field joint, and it was successfully recovered on April 13. Of the 196,726 lb (89,233 kg) of both SRB shells, 102,500 lb (46,500 kg) was recovered, another 54,000 lb (24,000 kg) was found but not recovered, and 40,226 lb (18,246 kg) was never found.

On March 7, Air Force divers identified potential crew compartment debris, which was confirmed the next day by divers from the USS Preserver. The damage to the crew compartment indicated that it had remained largely intact during the initial explosion but was extensively damaged on impacting the ocean. The remains of the crew were badly damaged from impact and submersion, and were not intact bodies. The USS Preserver made multiple trips to return debris and remains to port, and continued crew compartment recovery until April 4. During the recovery of the remains of the crew, Jarvis's body floated away and was not located until April 15, several weeks after the other remains had been positively identified. Once remains were brought to port, pathologists from the Armed Forces Institute of Pathology worked to identify the human remains, but could not determine the exact cause of death for any of them. Medical examiners in Brevard County disputed the legality of transferring human remains to US military officials to conduct autopsies, and refused to issue the death certificates; NASA officials ultimately released the death certificates of the crew members.

The IUS that would have been used to boost the orbit of the TDRS-B satellite was one of the first pieces of debris recovered. There was no indication that there had been premature ignition of the IUS, which had been one of the suspected causes for the disaster. Debris from the three SSMEs was recovered from February 14 to 28, and post-recovery analysis produced results consistent with functional engines suddenly losing their LH2 fuel supply. Deepwater recovery operations continued until April 29, with smaller scale, shallow recovery operations continuing until August 29. On December 17, 1996, two pieces of the orbiter were found at Cocoa Beach. On November 10, 2022, NASA announced that a 20-foot (6 m) piece of the shuttle had been found near the site of a destroyed World War II-era aircraft off the coast of Florida. The discovery was aired on the History Channel on November 22, 2022. Almost all recovered non-organic debris from Challenger is buried in Cape Canaveral Space Force Station missile silos at LC-31 and LC-32.

=== Funeral ceremonies ===
On April 29, 1986, the astronauts' remains were transferred on a C-141 Starlifter aircraft from Kennedy Space Center to the military mortuary at Dover Air Force Base in Delaware. Their caskets were each draped with an American flag and carried past an honor guard and followed by an astronaut escort. After the remains arrived at Dover Air Force Base, they were transferred to the families of the crew members. Scobee and Smith were buried at Arlington National Cemetery. Onizuka was buried at the National Memorial Cemetery of the Pacific in Honolulu, Hawaii. McNair was buried in Rest Lawn Memorial Park in Lake City, South Carolina, but his remains were later moved within the town to the Dr. Ronald E. McNair Memorial Park. Resnik was cremated and her ashes were scattered over the water. McAuliffe was buried at Calvary Cemetery in Concord, New Hampshire. Jarvis was cremated, and his ashes were scattered in the Pacific Ocean. Unidentified crew remains were buried at the Space Shuttle Challenger Memorial in Arlington on May 20, 1986.

== Public response ==
=== White House response ===
President Ronald Reagan's Speech on Space Shuttle Challenger, January 28, 1986

President Ronald Reagan had been scheduled to give the 1986 State of the Union Address on January 28, 1986, the evening of the Challenger disaster. After a discussion with his aides, Reagan postponed the State of the Union, and instead addressed the nation about the disaster from the Oval Office. On January 31, Ronald and Nancy Reagan traveled to the Johnson Space Center to speak at a memorial service honoring the crew members. During the ceremony, an Air Force band sang "God Bless America" as NASA T-38 Talon jets flew directly over the scene in the traditional missing-man formation.

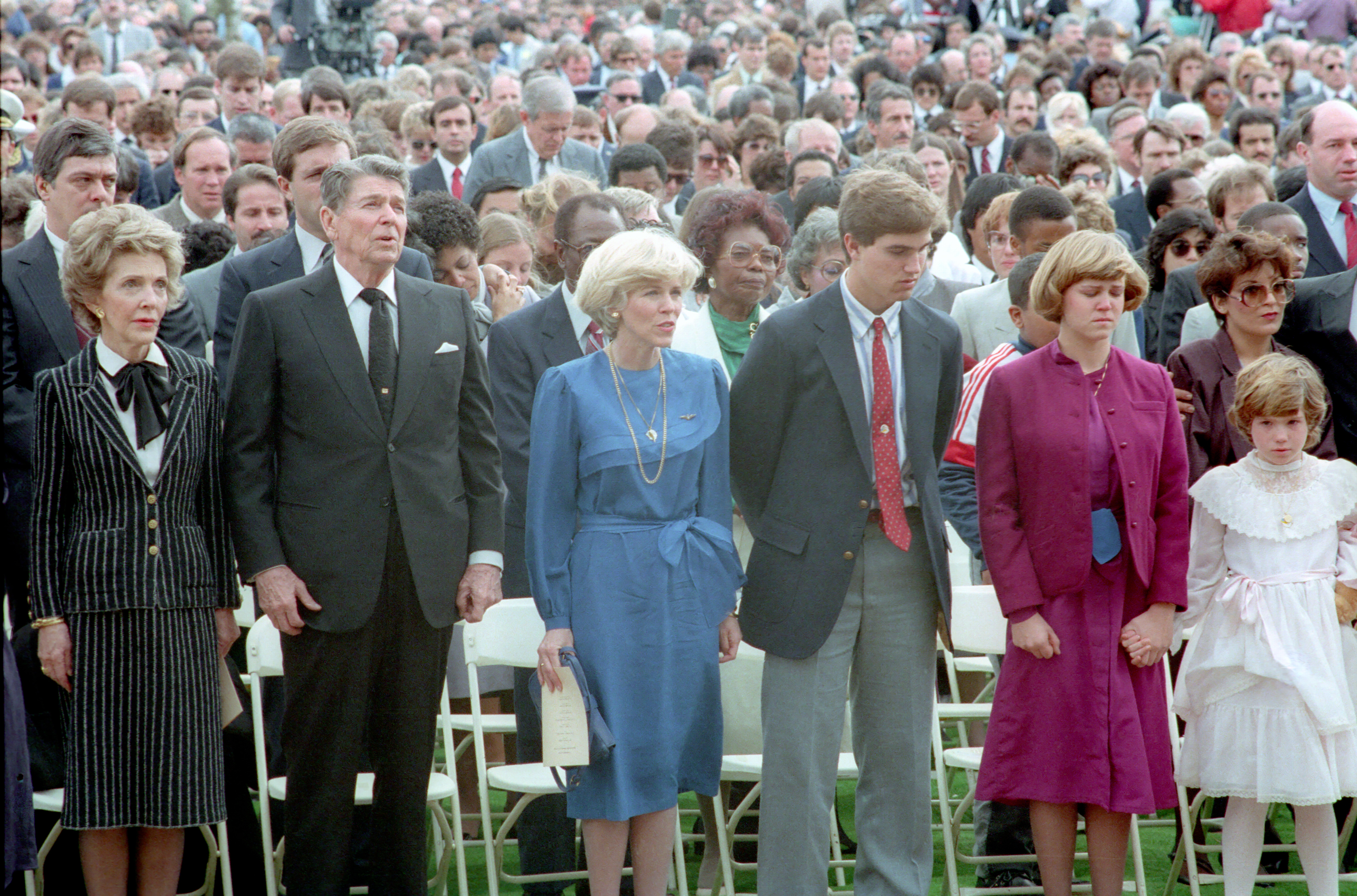
President Reagan and First Lady Nancy Reagan (left) at the memorial service on January 31, 1986

Soon after the disaster, Democratic politicians claimed that White House officials, including Chief of Staff Donald Regan and Communications Director Pat Buchanan, had pressured NASA to launch Challenger before the scheduled January 28 State of the Union address, because Reagan had planned to mention the launch in his remarks. In March 1986, the White House released a copy of the original State of the Union speech. In that speech, Reagan had intended to mention an X-ray experiment launched on Challenger and designed by a guest he had invited to the address, but he did not further discuss the Challenger launch. In the rescheduled State of the Union address on February 4, Reagan mentioned the deceased Challenger crew members and modified his remarks about the X-ray experiment as "launched and lost". In April 1986, the White House released a report that concluded there had been no pressure from the White House for NASA to launch Challenger prior to the State of the Union.

=== Media coverage ===
"It was so far away that the sound was just a pop, it looked odd, but we didn’t know what had happened. It didn't sink in." - John Weller, an 11-year-old child, one of six from Boulder County, chosen by Ball Aerospace to see the launch in person

Nationally televised live coverage of the launch and explosion was provided by CNN. To promote the Teacher in Space program with McAuliffe as a crewmember, NASA had arranged for many students in the US to view the launch live at school with their teachers. Other networks, such as CBS, soon cut in to their affiliate feeds to broadcast continuous coverage of the disaster and its aftermath. Press interest in the disaster increased in the following days; the number of reporters at KSC increased from 535 on the day of the launch to 1,467 reporters three days later. In the aftermath of the accident, NASA was criticized for not making key personnel available to the press. In the absence of information, the press published articles suggesting the external tank was the cause of the explosion. Until 2010, CNN's live broadcast was the only known footage filmed from the launch site. Additional amateur and professional recordings have since become publicly available. In the Soviet Union, footage of the disaster was played on the news, with coverage reflecting a tone that was described as being "somber and sympathetic" and "for the most part free of political overtones."

=== Engineering case study ===
The Challenger accident has been used as a case study for subjects such as engineering safety, the ethics of whistleblowing, communications and group decision-making, and the dangers of groupthink. Roger Boisjoly and Allan McDonald became speakers who advocated for responsible workplace decision making and engineering ethics. Information designer Edward Tufte has argued that the Challenger accident was the result of poor communications and overly complicated explanations on the part of engineers, and stated that showing the correlation of ambient air temperature and O-ring erosion amounts would have been sufficient to communicate the potential dangers of the cold-weather launch. Boisjoly and others contested this assertion and stated that the data presented by Tufte was not as simple or available as Tufte stated.

== Reports ==
=== Rogers Commission Report ===
The Presidential Commission on the Space Shuttle Challenger Accident, also known as the Rogers Commission after its chairman, was formed on February 6. Its members were Chairman William P. Rogers, Vice Chairman Neil Armstrong, David Acheson, Eugene Covert, Richard Feynman, Robert Hotz, Donald Kutyna, Sally Ride, Robert Rummel, Joseph Sutter, Arthur Walker, Albert Wheelon, and Chuck Yeager.

The commission held hearings that discussed the NASA accident investigation, the Space Shuttle program, and the Morton Thiokol recommendation to launch despite O-ring safety issues. On February 15, Rogers released a statement that established the commission's changing role to investigate the accident independent of NASA due to concerns of the failures of the internal processes at NASA. The commission created four investigative panels to research the different aspects of the mission. The Accident Analysis Panel, chaired by Kutyna, used data from salvage operations and testing to determine the exact cause behind the accident. The Development and Production Panel, chaired by Sutter, investigated the hardware contractors and how they interacted with NASA. The Pre-Launch Activities Panel, chaired by Acheson, focused on the final assembly processes and pre-launch activities conducted at KSC. The Mission Planning and Operations Panel, chaired by Ride, investigated the planning that went into mission development, along with potential concerns over crew safety and pressure to adhere to a schedule. Over a period of four months, the commission interviewed over 160 individuals, held at least 35 investigative sessions, and involved more than 6,000 NASA employees, contractors, and support personnel. The commission published its report on June 6, 1986.

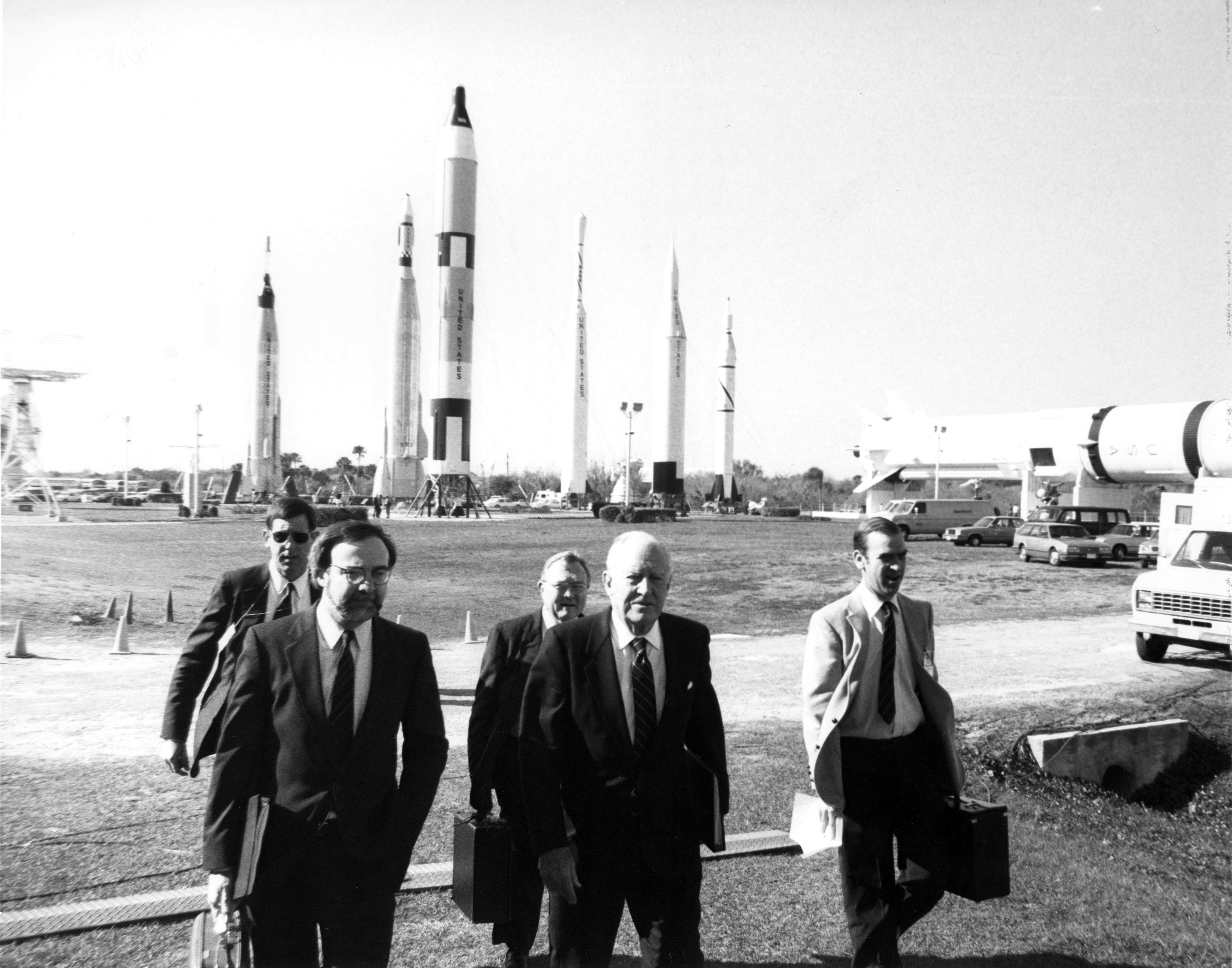
Members of the Rogers Commission arrive at Kennedy Space Center

The commission determined that the cause of the accident was hot gas blowing past the O-rings in the field joint on the right SRB, and found no other potential causes for the disaster. It attributed the accident to a faulty design of the field joint that was unacceptably sensitive to changes in temperature, dynamic loading, and the character of its materials. The report was critical of NASA and Morton Thiokol, and emphasized that both organizations had overlooked evidence that indicated the potential danger with the SRB field joints. It noted that NASA accepted the risk of O-ring erosion without evaluating how it could potentially affect the safety of a mission. The commission concluded that the safety culture and management structure at NASA were insufficient to properly report, analyze, and prevent flight issues. It stated that the pressure to increase the rate of flights negatively affected the amount of training, quality control, and repair work that was available for each mission.

The commission published a series of recommendations to improve the safety of the Space Shuttle program. It proposed a redesign of the joints in the SRB that would prevent gas from blowing past the O-rings. It also recommended that the program's management be restructured to keep project managers from being pressured to adhere to unsafe organizational deadlines, and should include astronauts to address crew safety concerns better. It proposed that an office for safety be established reporting directly to the NASA administrator to oversee all safety, reliability, and quality assurance functions in NASA programs. Additionally, the commission addressed issues with overall safety and maintenance for the orbiter, and it recommended the addition of the means for the crew to escape during controlled gliding flight.

During a televised hearing on February 11, Feynman demonstrated the loss of rubber's elasticity in cold temperatures using a glass of cold water and a piece of rubber, for which he received media attention. Feynman, a Nobel Prize-winning physicist, advocated for harsher criticism towards NASA in the report and repeatedly disagreed with Rogers. He threatened to remove his name from the report unless it included his personal observations on reliability, which appeared as Appendix F. In the appendix, he lauded the engineering and software accomplishments in the program's development, but he argued that multiple components, including the avionics and SSMEs in addition to the SRBs, were more dangerous and accident-prone than original NASA estimates had indicated.

=== US House Committee report ===
The US House Committee on Science and Technology conducted an investigation of the Challenger disaster and released a report on October 29, 1986. The committee, which had authorized the funding for the Space Shuttle program, reviewed the findings of the Rogers Commission as part of its investigation. The committee agreed with the Rogers Commission that the failed SRB field joint was the cause of the accident, and that NASA and Morton Thiokol failed to act despite numerous warnings of the potential dangers of the SRB. The committee's report further emphasized safety considerations of other components and recommended a risk management review for all critical systems.

== NASA response ==
=== SRB redesign ===
In response to the commission's recommendation, NASA initiated a redesign of the SRB, later named the redesigned solid rocket motor (RSRM), which was supervised by an independent oversight group. The redesigned joint included a capture feature on the tang around the interior wall of the clevis to prevent joint rotation. The space between the capture feature and the clevis was sealed with another O-ring. The capture feature reduced the potential of joint rotation to 15% of that which had occurred during the disaster. Should joint rotation occur, any rotation that reduced the O-ring seal on one side of the clevis wall would increase it on the other side. Additionally, heaters were installed to maintain consistent, higher temperatures of the O-rings. The RSRM was first tested on August 30, 1987. In April and August 1988, the RSRM was tested with intentional flaws that allowed hot gas to penetrate the field joint. These tests permitted the engineers to evaluate whether the improved field joint prevented joint rotation. Following the successful tests, the RSRM was certified to fly on the Space Shuttle.

=== Space Shuttle modifications ===
In addition to the SRBs, NASA increased the safety standards on other Space Shuttle program components. The critical items lists and failure modes for the SSMEs were updated, along with 18 hardware changes. The maximum thrust of the SSMEs was limited to 104%, with 109% only allowed in an abort scenario. The landing gear was updated to improve its steering and handling abilities while the Space Shuttle was landing. NASA implemented an escape option in which the astronauts would jettison the side hatch and extend a pole out of the orbiter; they would slide down the pole to avoid hitting the orbiter as they bailed out before they activated their parachutes. The orbiter's software was modified to maintain stable flight while all of the flight crew left the controls to escape. This escape method would not have saved the crew in the Challenger disaster, but was added in the event of another emergency.

=== Safety office ===
In 1986 NASA created a new Office of Safety, Reliability, and Quality Assurance, headed by a NASA associate administrator who reported directly to the NASA administrator, as the commission had specified. Former Challenger flight director Greene became chief of the Safety Division of the directorate. After the Space Shuttle Columbia disaster in 2003, the Columbia Accident Investigation Board (CAIB) concluded that NASA had not set up a "truly independent" office for safety oversight. The CAIB concluded that the ineffective safety culture that had resulted in the Challenger accident was also responsible for the subsequent disaster.

=== Teacher in Space ===
The Teacher in Space program, which McAuliffe had been selected for, was canceled in 1990 as a result of the Challenger disaster. In 1998, NASA replaced Teacher in Space with the Educator Astronaut Project, which differed in that it required the teachers to become professional astronauts trained as mission specialists, rather than short-term payload specialists who would return to their classrooms following their spaceflight. Barbara Morgan, who had been the backup teacher for McAuliffe, was selected to be part of NASA Astronaut Group 17 and flew on STS-118.

=== Return to flight ===
The projected launch schedule of 24 per year was criticized by the Rogers Commission as an unrealistic goal that created unnecessary pressure on NASA to launch missions. In August 1986, President Reagan approved the construction of an orbiter, which would later be named Endeavour, to replace Challenger. Construction of Endeavour began in 1987 and was completed in 1990, and it first flew on STS-49 in May 1992. He also announced that the program would no longer carry commercial satellite payloads, and that these would be launched using commercial expendable launch vehicles. These commercial payloads were reallocated from the Space Shuttle program to end the dependence on a single launch vehicle and limit the pressure on NASA to launch crewed missions to satisfy its customers.

The Space Shuttle fleet was grounded for two years and eight months while the program underwent investigation, redesign, and restructuring. On September 29, 1988, Discovery launched on STS-26 mission from LC-39B with a crew of five veteran astronauts. Its payload was TDRS-3, which was a substitute for the satellite lost with Challenger. The launch tested the redesigned boosters, and the crew wore pressure suits during the ascent and reentry. The mission was a success, and the program resumed flying.

=== Second accident ===
On February 1, 2003, the program had its second accident when Columbia disintegrated during reentry during STS-107, killing all seven crew members on board. The cause was bipod foam from the external tank striking the orbiter's left wing during launch. Once again, NASA's organizational culture was heavily scrutinized. As with the O-ring erosion, NASA did not consider foam strikes to be a potential risk to the astronauts, despite multiple instances of foam strikes on previous missions. In addition, scheduling issues had once again risen, as NASA was under internal pressure to adhere to a launch schedule for assembling the International Space Station. The Columbia Accident Investigation Board (CAIB) concluded that NASA had failed to learn many lessons from the Challenger disaster, stating: "NASA's response to the Rogers Commission did not meet the Commission's intent" and "the causes of the institutional failure responsible for Challenger have not been fixed." The Space Shuttle returned to flight in 2005 with STS-114.

== Legacy ==
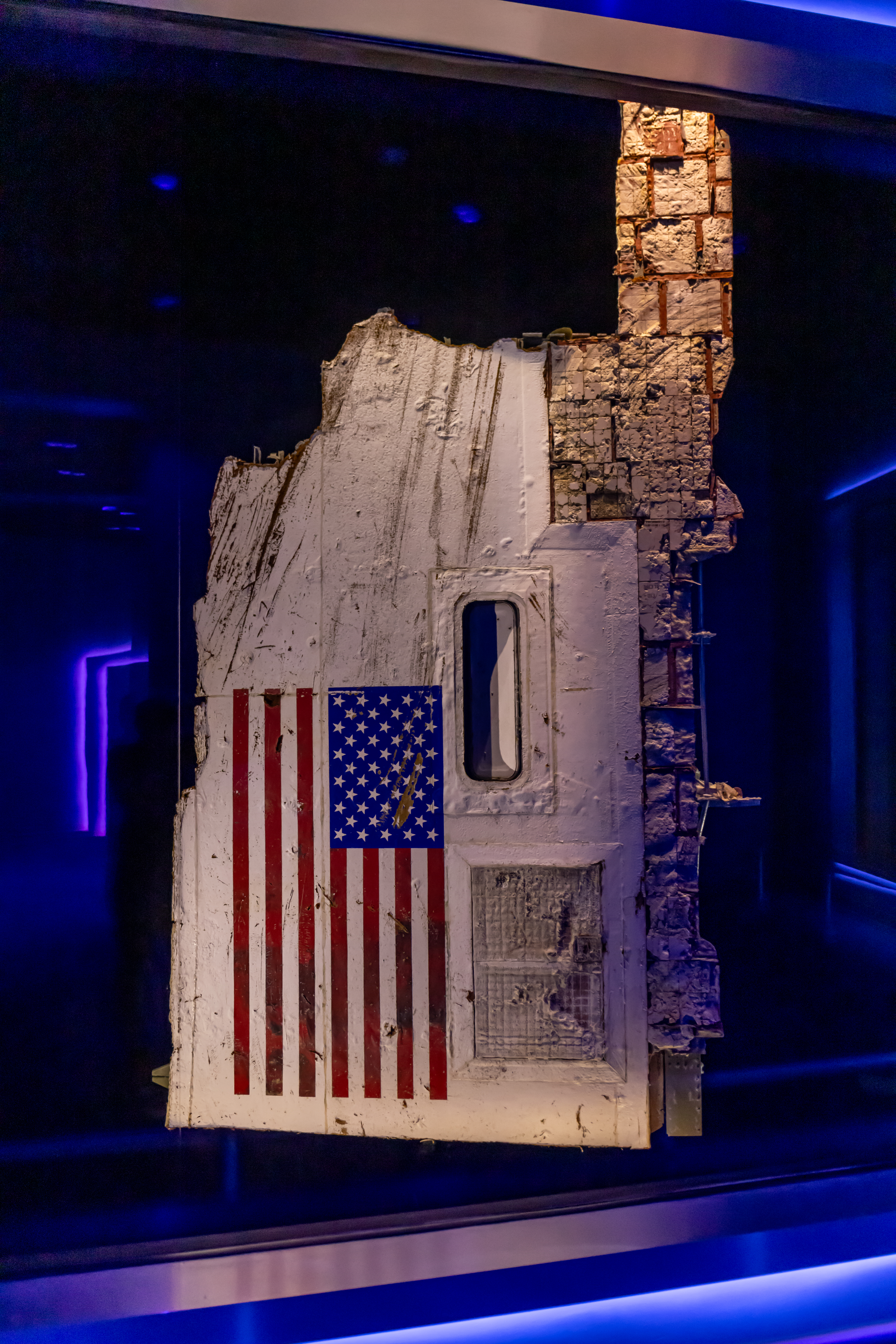
Fragment of Challenger's fuselage on display at the Kennedy Space Center Visitor Complex

In 2004, President George W. Bush conferred posthumous Congressional Space Medals of Honor to all 14 crew members killed in the Challenger and Columbia accidents. An unpainted decorative oval in the Brumidi Corridors of the United States Capitol was finished with a portrait depicting the crew by Charles Schmidt in 1987. The scene was painted on canvas and then applied to the wall. The "Forever Remembered" exhibit at the Kennedy Space Center Visitor Complex opened in July 2015 and includes a display of a 12-foot (3.7 m) section of Challenger's recovered fuselage. The exhibit was opened by NASA Administrator Charles Bolden along with family members of the crew. A tree for each Challenger astronaut was planted in NASA's Astronaut Memorial Grove at the Johnson Space Center, along with trees for each astronaut from the Apollo 1 and Columbia disasters. Seven asteroids were named after the crew members: 3350 Scobee, 3351 Smith, 3352 McAuliffe, 3353 Jarvis, 3354 McNair, 3355 Onizuka, and 3356 Resnik. The approved naming citation was published by the Minor Planet Center on March 26, 1986 (M.P.C. 10550). In 1988, seven craters on the far side of the Moon, within the Apollo Basin, were named after the astronauts by the IAU. The Soviet Union named two craters on Venus after McAuliffe and Resnik. The landing site of the Opportunity Mars rover was named Challenger Memorial Station.

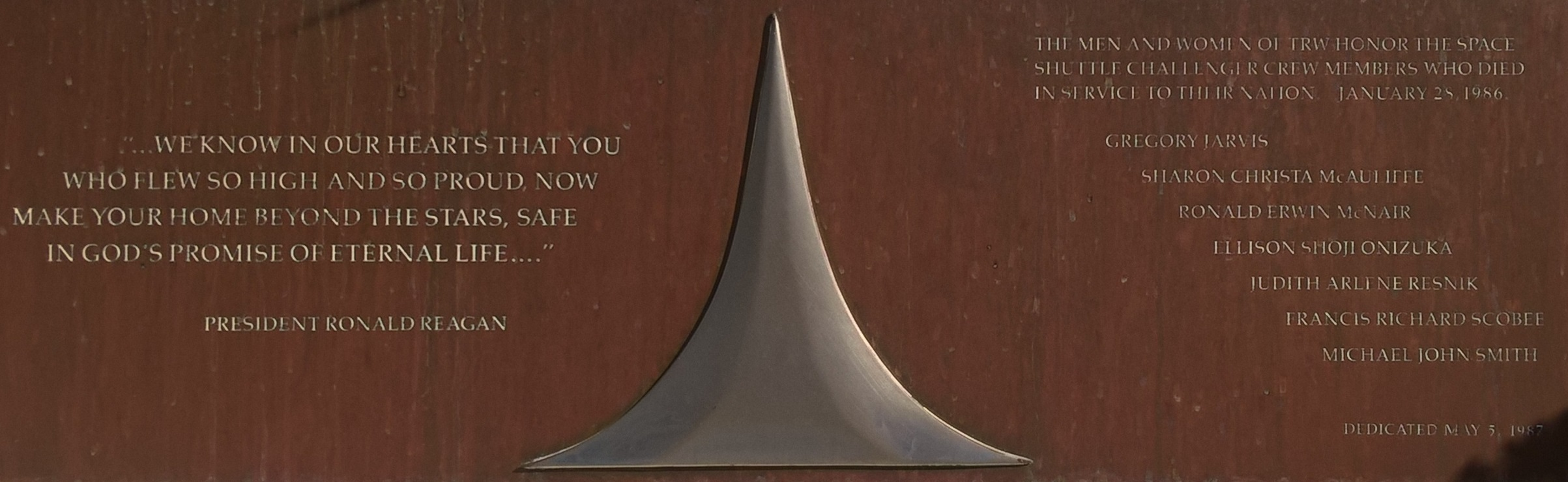
Plaque at TRW's Space Park honoring the Challenger crew. Its maiden flight and this final one had carried their TDRS satellites.

Several memorials have been established in honor of the Challenger disaster. The public Peers Park in Palo Alto, California, features the Challenger Memorial Grove including redwood trees grown from seeds carried aboard Challenger in 1985. Schools and streets have been renamed to include the names of the crew or Challenger. In 1990, a 1/10 scale replica of Challenger in liftoff position was erected in Little Tokyo district of Los Angeles, California. Challenger Point is a mountain peak of the Sangre de Cristo Range. The McAuliffe-Shepard Discovery Center, a science museum and planetarium in Concord, New Hampshire, is named in honor of McAuliffe, a Concord High School teacher, and Alan Shepard, who was from Derry, New Hampshire. The crew's families established the Challenger Center for Space Science Education as an educational non-profit organization.

An American flag, later named the Challenger flag, was carried aboard the Challenger. It was sponsored by Boy Scout Troop 514 of Monument, Colorado, and was recovered intact, still sealed in its plastic container. Onizuka had included a soccer ball with his personal effects that was recovered and later flown to the International Space Station aboard Soyuz Expedition 49 by American astronaut Shane Kimbrough. It is on display at Clear Lake High School in Houston, which was attended by Onizuka's children.

The 1986 motion picture Star Trek IV: The Voyage Home was dedicated to the crew of the Challenger with an opening message which stated "The cast and crew of Star Trek wish to dedicate this film to the men and women of the spaceship Challenger whose courageous spirit shall live to the 23rd century and beyond..."

The last track on French musician Jean-Michel Jarre's 1986 album Rendez-Vous was originally scheduled to include a saxophone part recorded by Ron McNair on board the Challenger, which would have made it the first piece of music to be recorded in space.

== In media ==
=== Books ===
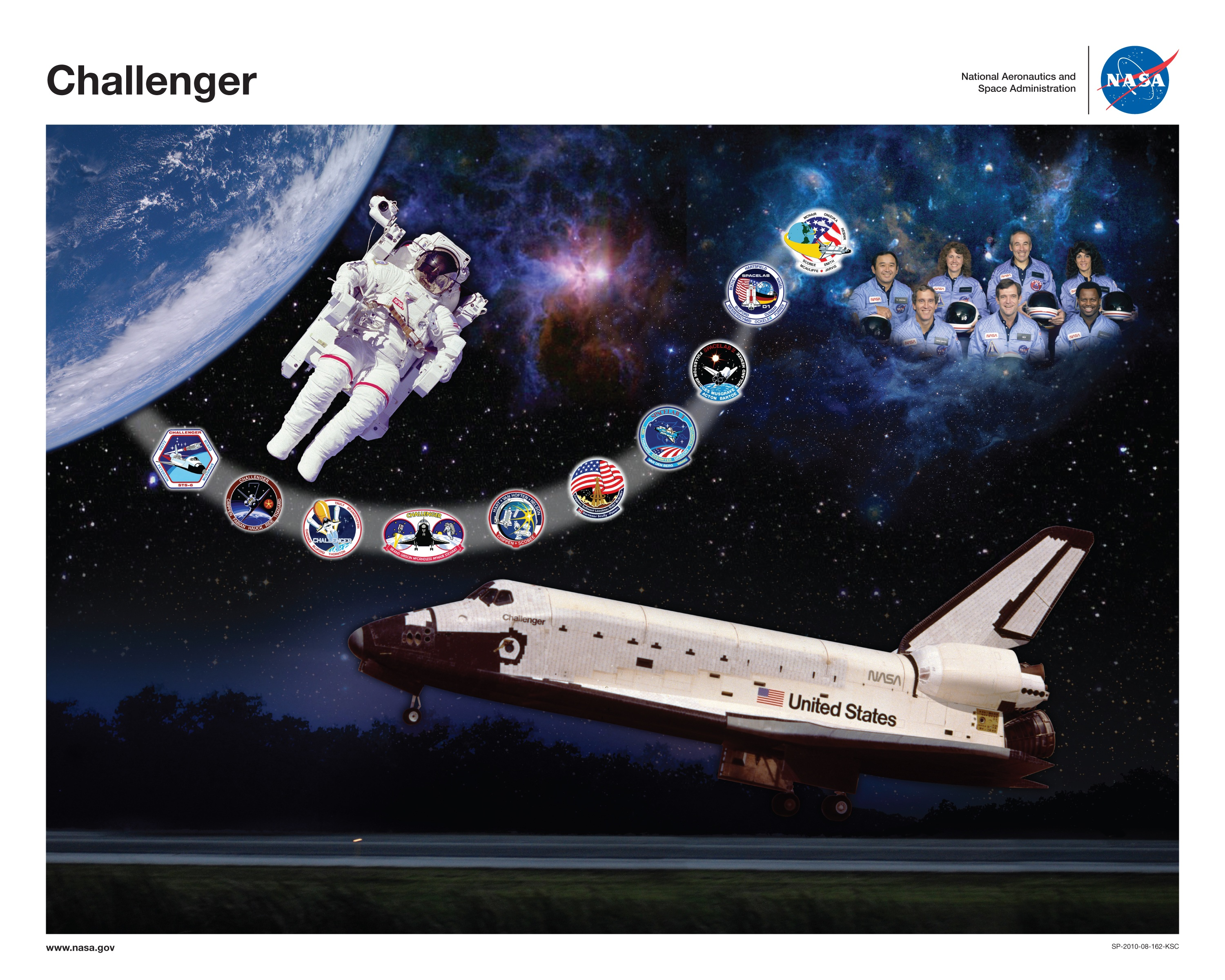
The tribute poster of Challenger

In the years immediately after the Challenger disaster, several books were published describing the factors and causes of the accident and the subsequent investigation and changes. In 1987, Malcolm McConnell, a journalist and a witness of the disaster, published Challenger–A Major Malfunction: A True Story of Politics, Greed, and the Wrong Stuff. McConnell's book was criticized for arguing for a conspiracy involving NASA Administrator Fletcher awarding the contract to Morton Thiokol because it was from his home state of Utah. The book Prescription for Disaster: From the Glory of Apollo to the Betrayal of the Shuttle by Joseph Trento was also published in 1987, arguing that the Space Shuttle program had been a flawed and politicized program from its inception. In 1988, Feynman's memoir, "What Do You Care What Other People Think?": Further Adventures of a Curious Character, was published. The latter half of the book discusses his involvement in the Rogers Commission and his relationship with Kutyna.

Books were published long after the disaster. In 1996, Diane Vaughan published The Challenger Launch Decision: Risky Technology, Culture, and Deviance at NASA, which argues that NASA's structure and mission, rather than just Space Shuttle program management, created a climate of risk acceptance that resulted in the disaster. Also in 1996, Claus Jensen published No Downlink: A Dramatic Narrative About the Challenger Accident and Our Time, which primarily discusses the development of rocketry prior to the disaster, and was criticized for its reliance on secondary sources with little original research conducted for the book. In 2009, Allan McDonald published his memoir written with space historian James Hansen, Truth, Lies, and O-Rings: Inside the Space Shuttle Challenger Disaster, which focuses on his personal involvement in the launch, disaster, investigation, and return to flight, and is critical of NASA and Morton Thiokol leadership for agreeing to launch Challenger despite engineers' warnings about the O-rings. In 2024, British Journalist Adam Higginbotham published Challenger: A True Story of Heroism and Disaster on the Edge of Space, a detailed historical account of the events leading up to, during, and following the disaster.

=== Film and television ===
The ABC television movie titled Challenger was broadcast on February 25, 1990. It stars Barry Bostwick as Scobee and Karen Allen as McAuliffe. The movie is critical of NASA and positively portrays the engineers who argued against launching. The movie was criticized by the widows of Smith, McNair, and Onizuka as an inaccurate portrayal of events. A BBC docudrama titled The Challenger Disaster was broadcast on March 18, 2013. It starred William Hurt as Feynman and portrayed the investigation into the causes of the disaster. A film directed by Nathan VonMinden, The Challenger Disaster, was released on January 25, 2019, depicts fictional characters participating in the decision process to launch.

The eleventh episode of the American sitcom Mixed-ish, titled "When Doves Cry", revolves around the characters' grief, trauma, and eventual acceptance after watching the Challenger disaster.

The four-part docuseries Challenger: The Final Flight, created by Steven Leckart and Glen Zipper, was released by Netflix on September 16, 2020. It uses interviews with NASA and Morton Thiokol personnel to argue against their flawed decision-making which produced a preventable disaster.

The first episode of the Australian television drama The Newsreader, broadcast on August 15, 2021, depicts the disaster from the perspective of the television industry, specifically the journalists and crew within, and of, an Australian television newsroom at the time; a co-lead character's hosting of a newsflash weaving in with an overarching background storyline about the shift in news presentation from serious to that of allowing emotion into its delivery.

The first episode of Season 6 of the television drama series This Is Us titled "The Challenger" features coverage of the disaster seen by children in school, their reactions, and a parent's worry about how it would be explained to the children.

== See also ==
- Criticism of the Space Shuttle program
- Engineering disasters
- List of spaceflight-related accidents and incidents
- List of photographs considered the most important
- Normalization of deviance
- PEPCON disaster
