= Midnight in Chernobyl =

2019 non-fiction book by Adam Higginbotham

- First edition
- Author: Adam Higginbotham
- Genre: History
- Publisher: Simon & Schuster
- Publication date: 2019
- Media type: Print (hardcover and paperback)
- Pages: 538
- ISBN: 978-1501134616

Midnight in Chernobyl: The Untold Story of the World's Greatest Nuclear Disaster (2019) by Adam Higginbotham is a history of the Chernobyl nuclear disaster that occurred in Soviet Ukraine in 1986. It won the Andrew Carnegie Medal for Excellence in Nonfiction in 2020. Higginbotham spent more than a decade interviewing eyewitnesses and reviewing documents from the disaster, including some that were recently declassified. Higginbotham considers it the first English-language account that is close to the truth.

== Awards and honors ==
- 2019 The New York Times Ten Best Books
- 2020 Andrew Carnegie Medal for Excellence in Nonfiction
