= Adam Higginbotham =

British journalist (born 1968)

- Born: 1968 (age 57–58); Somerset, England
- Occupation: Journalist
- Writing career
- Language: English
- Subjects: Non-fiction and investigative journalism
- Notable awards: 2020 Carnegie Medal for Excellence in Non-fiction
- Website: www.adamhigginbotham.com

Adam Higginbotham (born 1968) is a British journalist who is the former U.S. correspondent for The Sunday Telegraph Magazine and former editor-in-chief of The Face. He has also served as a contributing writer for The New Yorker, Wired, and The New York Times.

Higginbotham is the author of Midnight in Chernobyl: The Untold Story of the World's Greatest Nuclear Disaster, published in 2019 by Simon & Schuster, which received the 2020 William E. Colby Award for Military and Intelligence Writing, the 2020 Andrew Carnegie Medal for Excellence in Non-Fiction, and was selected one of the 10 Best Books of 2019 by The New York Times.

In 2024, Higginbotham released Challenger: A True Story of Heroism and Disaster on the Edge of Space (ISBN 978-1-98217-661-7), about the Space Shuttle Challenger disaster.
