= Challenger: A True Story of Heroism and Disaster on the Edge of Space =

2024 non-fiction book by Adam Higginbotham

- Author: Adam Higginbotham
- Language: English
- Subject: Space Shuttle Challenger disaster
- Genre: Non-fiction, history
- Publisher: Simon & Schuster
- Publication date: May 14, 2024
- Publication place: United States
- Media type: Print (hardcover), e-book, audiobook
- Pages: 576
- ISBN: 9781982176617

Challenger: A True Story of Heroism and Disaster on the Edge of Space is a 2024 non-fiction book by author Adam Higginbotham. The book provides a detailed historical account of the events leading up to, during, and following the Space Shuttle Challenger disaster of January 28, 1986.

== Synopsis ==
The book chronicles the development of NASA's Space Shuttle program, profiles the crew of the STS-51-L mission, and details the technical and organizational failures that resulted in the destruction of the Space Shuttle Challenger and the deaths of its seven astronauts. It draws on historical records, interviews, and transcripts to reconstruct the story.

== Reception ==
The book received positive reviews from major publications. Critics noted its extensive research and narrative approach to the historical event.
