= Jean-Michel Jarre discography =

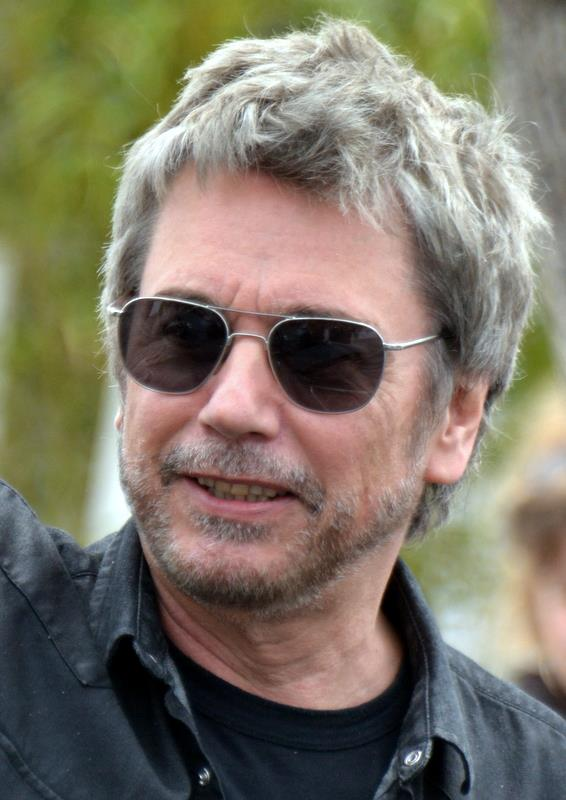
- Jarre in 2016
- Studio albums: 22
- Soundtrack albums: 1
- Live albums: 11
- Compilation albums: 16
- Singles: 47
- Video albums: 21
- Music videos: 34
- Remix and cover albums: 3
- Books: 11

Jean-Michel André Jarre (born 24 August 1948) is a French composer, performer and music producer. He is a pioneer in the electronic, synthpop, ambient and new-age genres, and an organiser of outdoor spectacles of his music featuring lights, laser displays, and fireworks.

Jarre was raised in Lyon by his mother and grandparents, and trained on the piano. From an early age he was introduced to a variety of art forms, including those of street performers, jazz musicians, and the artist Pierre Soulages. He played guitar in a band, but his musical style was perhaps most heavily influenced by Pierre Schaeffer, a pioneer of musique concrète at the Groupe de Recherches Musicales.

His first mainstream success was the 1976 album Oxygène. Recorded in a makeshift studio at his home, the album sold an estimated 12 million copies. Oxygène was followed in 1978 by Equinoxe, and in 1979 Jarre performed to a record-breaking audience of more than a million people at the Place de la Concorde, a record he has since broken three times. More albums were to follow, but his 1979 concert served as a blueprint for his future performances around the world. Several of his albums have been released to coincide with large-scale outdoor events, and he is now perhaps as well known for these performances as his albums.

Jarre has sold an estimated 80 million albums and singles. He was the first Western musician to be allowed to perform in the People's Republic of China, and holds the world record for the largest-ever audience at an outdoor event.

== Albums ==
=== Studio albums ===
Year	Album details	Peak chart positions												Certifications
Year	Album details	FRA	AUS	AUT	FIN	GER	NL	NOR	SWE	SWI	UK	US	NZ	Certifications
1972	Deserted Palace: Released: 1972; Format: LP	—	—	—	—	—	—	—	—	—	—	—	—	
1976	Oxygène: Released: December 1976 (France); July 1977 (international); Format: LP, MC, CD	1	29	10	12	8	4	9	3	85	2	78	3	SNEP: Gold; ARIA: Platinum; BPI: Platinum; BVMI: Gold; MC: Platinum
1978	Equinoxe: Released: 1 December 1978; Format: LP, MC, CD	1	48	14	—	22	3	—	—	—	11	126	36	BPI: Gold; BVMI: Gold; MC: Gold; NVPI: Gold
1981	Les Chants Magnétiques (Magnetic Fields): Released: 20 May 1981; Format: LP, MC, CD	1	76	4	20	9	5	20	22	—	6	98	22	BPI: Gold; NVPI: Gold
1983	Musique pour Supermarché (Music for Supermarkets): Released: 6 July 1983; Format: LP (one single copy)	—	—	—	—	—	—	—	—	—	—	—	—	
1984	Zoolook: Released: 16 November 1984; Format: LP, MC, CD	—	69	28	—	24	27	—	21	30	47	—	35	BPI: Silver
1986	Rendez-Vous: Released: 1 April 1986; Format: LP, MC, CD	1	58	15	6	20	12	—	8	24	9	52	26	SNEP: 2× Platinum; BPI: Gold
1988	Revolutions: Released: 26 September 1988; Format: CD, MC, LP	6	91	13	9	28	17	4	13	13	2	—	—	SNEP: 2× Gold; BPI: Silver
1990	En attendant Cousteau (Waiting for Cousteau): Released: 11 June 1990; Format: CD, MC, LP	2	—	19	12	27	27	11	22	21	14	—	—	SNEP: 2× Gold
1993	Chronologie: Released: 24 May 1993; Format: CD, MC, LP	2	—	32	10	50	56	—	25	21	11	—	—	IFPI SWI: Platinum
1997	Oxygène 7–13: Released: 17 February 1997; Format: CD, MC, LP	6	89	2	11	19	10	4	16	24	11	—	20	IFPI AUT: Gold
2000	Métamorphoses: Released: 31 January 2000; Format: CD, MC, MD	7	—	28	7	17	42	19	30	32	37	—	—	
2002	Sessions 2000: Released: 4 November 2002; Format: CD	140	—	—	—	—	—	—	—	—	—	—	—	
2003	Geometry of Love: Released: October 2003; Format: CD	—	—	—	—	—	—	—	—	—	—	—	—	
2007	Téo & Téa: Released: 26 March 2007; Format: CD, CD/DVD	8	—	—	—	—	46	—	—	43	103	—	—	
2007	Oxygène: New Master Recording: Released: 26 November 2007; Format: CD, CD/DVD	40	—	—	—	—	—	—	—	—	140	—	—	
2015	Electronica 1: The Time Machine: Released: 16 October 2015; Format: CD, LP	3	—	12	30	4	5	14	20	2	8	—	37	
2016	Electronica 2: The Heart of Noise: Released: 6 May 2016; Format: CD, LP	9	—	22	19	12	14	27	27	5	8	—	—	
2016	Oxygène 3: Released: 2 December 2016; Format: CD, LP, digital download	50	—	47	23	34	20	—	46	14	41	—	—	
2018	Equinoxe Infinity: Released: 16 November 2018; Format: CD, LP, Limited edition CD/LP set	29	—	31	17	11	26	—	—	15	33	—	—	
2021	Amazônia: Released: 9 April 2021; Format: CD, LP, digital download, streaming	34	—	13	—	5	24	—	—	4	21	—	—	
2022	Oxymore: Released: 21 October 2022; Format: CD, LP, digital download, streaming	20	—	17	—	14	21	—	—	11	41	—	—	

=== Soundtrack albums ===
Year	Album details
1973	Les Granges Brûlées: Format: LP, CD; Link to Wiki article on the film.

=== Live albums ===
Year	Album details	Peak chart positions										Certifications
Year	Album details	FRA	AUS	AUT	FIN	GER	NL	SWE	SWI	UK	NZ	Certifications
1982	Les Concerts en Chine (The Concerts in China): Released: May 1982; Format: LP, CD	5	76	—	—	35	9	—	—	6	46	BPI: Gold
1987	En Concert Houston/Lyon (In Concert Houston/Lyon): Released: 6 July 1987; Format: LP, CD	2	94	19	—	31	14	11	10	18	—	SNEP: Platinum; BPI: Silver
1989	Jarre Live: Released: 2 October 1989; Re-released in 1996 as Destination Docklands: The London Concert; Format: CD, LP	16	—	—	19	—	57	45	—	16	—	BPI: Silver
1994	Hong Kong: Format: CD	21	—	—	—	—	—	—	—	—	—	
1998	Paris Live "Electronic Night"; Featuring Tetsuya "TK" Komuro: Included in TK 1998 box set with Paris Live "Rendez-Vous '98 Electronic Night" VHS; Format: CD	—	—	—	—	—	—	—	—	—	—	
2004	Jarre in China: Format: CD/DVD	—	—	—	—	—	—	—	—	—	—	
2005	Live from Gdańsk (Koncert w Stoczni): Format: CD	—	—	—	—	—	—	—	—	—	—	
2006	Live Printemps de Bourges 2002: Format: Digital download (iTunes-only release)	—	—	—	—	—	—	—	—	—	—	
2021	Welcome to the Other Side: Concert from Virtual Notre-Dame: Format: Digital download, CD/Blu-ray, LP	41	—	73	—	8	39	—	33	63	—	
2024	Versailles 400 Live: Format: Digital download, CD digipak (limited edition, 2000 copies), 2x 180g Vinyl (limited numbered edition, 2000 copies)	—	—	—	—	59	84	—	—	—	—	
2025	Live in Bratislava: Format: Digital download, CD digipak/Blu-ray	76	—	—	—	—	—	—	—	—	—	

=== Compilation albums ===
Year	Album details	Peak chart positions								Certifications
Year	Album details	FRA	AUS	AUT	FIN	GER	NL	SWI	UK	Certifications
1982	Synthesis: Italian-only release; Format: LP, CS	—	—	—	—	—	—	—	—	
1983	Musik aus Zeit und Raum: Central European-release only; Format: LP, MC, CD	—	—	5	—	3	—	—	—	
1983	The Essential Jean-Michel Jarre: Released: 28 October 1983; Format: LP, MC, CD	—	51	—	—	—	—	—	14	SNEP: 2× Gold; BPI: Gold
1985	The Essential 1976–1986: Format: LP, MC, CD	—	—	—	—	—	—	—	—	
1989	Les Années Laser: Format: 10-CD (box set)	—	—	—	—	—	—	—	—	
1991	Images – The Best of Jean-Michel Jarre: Released: 14 October 1991; Format: CD, MC, LP	2	—	—	15	20	85	23	14	SNEP: Gold; BPI: Gold; BVMI: Gold
1997	Complete Oxygène: Limited edition; Format: 2CD	—	—	—	—	—	—	—	—	
2004	The Essential: Format: CD	23	—	—	—	—	—	—	—	
2004	AERO: Released: 20 September 2004; Format: CD	2	—	60	—	37	33	61	14	SNEP: Gold; BPI: Silver
2006	Sublime Mix: Limited edition for Jaguar France; Format: CD	—	—	—	—	—	—	—	—	
2007	The Complete Oxygène: Format: 3CD	—	—	—	—	—	—	—	—	
2011	Essentials & Rarities: Format: 2CD	70	—	—	—	—	89	—	—	
2011	Rarities: Format: LP	—	—	—	—	—	—	—	—	
2015	Essential Recollection: Format: CD	137	—	—	—	—	—	—	—	
2016	Oxygène Trilogy: Format: 3×CD, 3×CD+3×LP+book	—	—	68	—	25	58	34	78	
2018	Planet Jarre: 50 Years of Music: Released: 14 September 2018; Format: LP, 2CD	39	—	22	45	5	23	11	21	

=== Remix albums ===
Year	Album details	Peak chart positions		
Year	Album details	FRA	NL	UK
1994	Chronologie Part 6 (Remixes): Released: May 1994; Format: CD	—	—	60
1995	Jarremix: Released: 1995; Format: CD	24	—	—
1998	Odyssey Through O_{2}: Released: 1998; Format: CD	10	92	50
2015	Remix EP (I): Released: 2015; Format: Digital	—	—	—
2023	Oxymoreworks: Released: 3 November 2023; Format: CD, Digital	—	—	—

== Non-album tracks ==
In addition to the catalogue of songs featured on his studio albums, Jarre has also recorded (or recordings exist of) over 30 songs not included on the original editions of the studio albums. These include new songs featured on compilation albums, soundtracks, live albums, single B-sides, stand-alone singles, songs featured on special edition releases of studio albums and songs performed live on TV. The songs featured in the table below have either been released officially, and/or have high quality recordings (video or audio) of them accessible on public access sites such as YouTube.

Title	First Appearance	Year	Other Appearances
Souvenir of China	The Concerts in China	1981	Various Concert Videos, Broadcasts and Live CD's, AERO (2004 Version)
Arpegiator (Live)	The Concerts in China	1981	Musik aus Zeit und Raum, Soundtrack to 9½ Weeks
Orient Express (Live)	The Concerts in China	1981	Musik aus Zeit und Raum, Images (Studio)
Laser Harp (Live)	The Concerts in China	1981	
Fishing Junks at Sunset (Live)	The Concerts in China	1981	Hong Kong Live CD
Night in Shanghai (Live)	The Concerts in China	1981	
Moon Machine	Images	1991	
Globe Trotter	Images	1991	
Eldorado	Images	1991	Concert for Tolerance Laser Disk and Unofficial CD, The Twelve Dreams of the Sun
Paris La Défense (Live Intro)	Paris La Défense Video and Unofficial CD	1991	
Digi Sequencer (Live)	Europe in Concert Video	1993	Hong Kong Live CD, Concert for Tolerance Laser Disk and Unofficial CD
Vivaldi Tribute (Live) (feat Patrick Rondat)	Concert for Tolerance Laser Disk and Unofficial CD	1995	Amphibia (Patrick Rondat), Jarre in China
Rave-Oulton (Live)	Oxygène in Moscow Video	1997	Oxygène Tour Unofficial CD’s, Nuit Electronic Video
Together Now (with Tetsuya Komuro)	Together Now Single (Theme for France 1998 FIFA World Cup)	1998	Nuit Electronic Video (Live)
Paris Underground (Live) (with Tetsuya Komuro)	Nuit Electronic Video	1998	
Oxygène in the Ghetto (Live) (with Tetsuya Komuro)	Nuit Electronic Video	1998	
Salma Ya Salama (Live)	The Twelve Dreams of the Sun TV Broadcast and Unofficial CD	2000	
The Sun (Live)	The Twelve Dreams of the Sun TV Broadcast and Unofficial CD	2000	
Akropolis (Live)	Hymn to the Akropolis TV Broadcast and Unofficial CD	2001	Live from Gdansk DVD (as Tribute to John Paul II)
Alive in Bourges (Live)	Live Printemps de Bourges 2002	2002	Reworked as Aero 2002 with Safri Duo at Aero TV Broadcast and Unofficial CD
Aerozone	AERO	2004	Jarre in China
Aerology	AERO	2004	Jarre in China
Aero (2004)	AERO	2004	Jarre in China
Forbidden City (Live)	Jarre in China	2004	
Theremin Memories (Live)	Jarre in China	2004	Live from Gdansk DVD
La Foule (Tribute to Edith Piaf) (Live)	Jarre in China	2004	
Tian’anmen (Live)	Jarre in China	2004	

== Singles ==
This list does not include downloads or promotional singles.

Year	Song	Chart positions								Album
Year	Song	FRA	AUS	BEL	NL	SPA	UK	NZ	US Dance	Album
1971	"La Cage" [F]	—	—	—	—	—	—	—	—	non-album
1973	"La Chanson Des Granges Brûlées"	—	—	—	—	—	—	—	—	Les Granges Brûlées
1977	"Oxygène 4"	3	26	3	3	—	4	6	—	Oxygène
1977	"Oxygène 2"	—	61	—	—	—	—	—	—	Oxygène
1978	"Equinoxe 5"	5	—	16	10	—	45	—	—	Equinoxe
1979	"Equinoxe 4" (single remix)	10	—	—	—	—	—	—	—	Equinoxe
1980	"Equinoxe 7" (At the Concorde - live)	—	—	—	—	—	—	—	—	non-album
1981	"Magnetic Fields 2"	2	—	40	33	—	—	—	—	Les Chants Magnétiques
1981	"Magnetic Fields 4" (single remix)	—	—	—	—	—	—	—	—	Les Chants Magnétiques
1981	"The Last Rumba" [N]	—	—	—	—	—	—	—	—	Les Chants Magnétiques
1982	"Orient Express" (live)	—	—	—	—	—	—	—	—	Les Concerts en Chine
1982	"Souvenir De Chine"	4	—	—	—	—	—	—	—	Les Concerts en Chine
1984	"Zoolook"	60	—	—	—	—	—	—	—	Zoolook
1985	"Zoolookologie" (single remix)	—	—	—	—	—	—	—	—	Zoolook
1986	"Rendez-Vous 4"	13	79	—	—	—	65	—	41	Rendez-Vous
1987	"Rendez-Vous 2" (live)	—	—	—	—	—	—	—	—	En Concert Houston/Lyon
1987	"Rendez-Vous 4" (live)	—	—	—	—	—	—	—	—	En Concert Houston/Lyon
1988	"Revolutions"	—	—	—	—	—	52	—	—	Revolutions
1988	"London Kid"	—	—	—	—	—	52	—	—	Revolutions
1989	"Oxygène 4" (remix)	—	—	—	—	—	65	—	—	non-album
1990	"Calypso"	34	149	—	—	—	91	—	—	En attendant Cousteau
1993	"Chronologie 4"	10	—	—	—	—	55	—	45	Chronologie
1993	"Chronologie 6"	—	—	—	—	—	—	—	—	Chronologie
1993	"Chronologie 2" [F]	—	—	—	—	—	—	—	—	Chronologie
1993	"Chronologie 8" [F]	—	—	—	—	—	—	—	—	Chronologie
1994	"Chronologie 6" (live) [F]	—	—	—	—	—	—	—	—	Hong Kong
1997	"Oxygène 8"	—	—	—	53	—	17	—	17	Oxygène 7–13
1997	"Oxygène 10"	42	—	—	76	—	21	—	—	Oxygène 7–13
1997	"Oxygène 7"	—	—	—	—	—	—	—	—	Oxygène 7–13
1998	"Rendez-Vous 98" (with Apollo 440)	—	—	—	—	—	12	—	—	Music of the World Cup: Allez! Ola! Ole!
1998	"Together Now" (with Tetsuya Komuro) [J]	—	—	—	—	—	—	—	—	Music of the World Cup: Allez! Ola! Ole!
1999	"C'est la vie" (with Natacha Atlas)	95	—	—	60	4	40	—	—	Métamorphoses
2000	"Tout est bleu"	—	—	—	—	—	79	—	—	Métamorphoses
2007	"Téo & Téa"	—	—	—	—	—	—	—	—	Téo & Téa
2015	"Conquistador" (with Gesaffelstein)	—	—	—	—	—	—	—	—	Electronica 1: The Time Machine
2015	"Glory" (with M83)	—	—	—	—	—	—	—	—	Electronica 1: The Time Machine
2015	"Zero Gravity" (with Tangerine Dream)	—	—	—	—	—	—	—	—	Electronica 1: The Time Machine
2015	"Watching You" (with 3D)	—	—	—	—	—	—	—	—	Electronica 1: The Time Machine
2015	"Stardust" (with Armin van Buuren)	180	—	—	—	—	—	—	—	Electronica 1: The Time Machine
2015	"If..!" (with Little Boots)	—	—	—	—	—	—	—	—	Electronica 1: The Time Machine
2016	"The Heart of Noise" (with Rone)	—	—	—	—	—	—	—	—	Electronica 2: The Heart of Noise
2016	"What You Want" (with Peaches)	—	—	—	—	—	—	—	—	Electronica 2: The Heart of Noise
2016	"As One" (with Primal Scream)	—	—	—	—	—	—	—	—	Electronica 2: The Heart of Noise
2016	"Oxygène 17"	—	—	—	—	—	—	—	—	Oxygène 3
2018	"Infinity (Movement 6)"	—	—	—	—	—	—	—	—	Equinoxe Infinity
2022	"Brutalism"	—	—	—	—	—	—	—	—	Oxymore
2024	"Epica Oxygène"	—	—	—	—	—	—	—	—	Versailles 400 Live

Notes:

- F – Released in France only
- N – Released in NL
- U - Released in UK
- J - Released in Japan

== Videography ==
=== Video albums ===
- Place de la Concorde (1980, VHS PAL-G & SECAM)
- The China Concerts (1989, VHS PAL-G)
- Rendez-vous Houston: A City in Concert (1989, VHS PAL-G)
- Rendez-vous Lyon: Concert for the Pope (1989, VHS PAL-G)
- Destination Docklands (1989, VHS PAL-G)
- Images – The Best of Jean-Michel Jarre (1991, VHS NTSC)
- Paris La Défense (1992, VHS SECAM/VHS PAL-G)
- Europe in Concert (1994, VHS NTSC)
- Concert pour la Tolerance (1995, Laserdisc PAL)
- Oxygen in Moscow (1997, DVD NTSC/VHS PAL-G, released on the US and Brazil)
- Paris Live: Rendez-vous 98 Electronic Night (1998, VHS NTSC, released on Japan as part of Tetsuya "TK" Komuro's "TK 1998" boxset)
- Aero DVD (2004)
- Live in Beijing (2004, DVD PAL, 1-disc release in France only)
- Jarre in China (2005, DVD PAL, 2-disc European re-release of the above with extra features)
- Jean-Michel Jarre: Solidarnosc Live (2005, DVD NTSC; released in 1-disc and 2-disc DVD/CD versions)
- Teo & Tea DVD (2007, DVD 5.1 with the "Teo & Tea" video in high definition HD, included in the "De Luxe Edition CD")
- Oxygène in Moscow DVD (2007, including "Oxygène in Moscow 1997 concert" + bonus "The Making of Oxygène in Moscow")
- Oxygène 2D DVD (2007, available with the special edition Oxygène 2007 album)
- Oxygène 3D DVD (2007, limited edition box set which also includes 2 pairs of 3D glasses)
- Welcome to the Other Side - Live in Notre Dame VR (2021, Blu-ray, limited edition box set which also includes masterclass, forum des images, making of, behind the scenes and album 5.0 Mix)
- Live in Bratislava (2025, 2xBlu-ray, collector's edition box set)

=== Music videos ===
Year	Title	Album
1977	"Oxygène (Part 4)"	Oxygène
1978	"Equinoxe (Part 4)"	Equinoxe
1979	"Equinoxe (Part 5)"	Equinoxe
1981	"Magnetic Fields (Part 2)"	Les Chants Magnétiques
1982	"Orient Express"	The Concerts in China
1982	"Souvenir of China"	The Concerts in China
1984	"Zoolook"	Zoolook
1985	"Zoolookologie"	Zoolook
1986	"Fourth Rendez-Vous"	Rendez-Vous
1988	"Revolutions"	Revolutions
1989	"Oxygène (Part 4)"	Jarre Live
1990	"Calypso"	En attendant Cousteau
1993	"Chronologie (Part 4)"	Chronologie
1993	"Chronologie (Part 2)"	Chronologie
1993	"Chronologie (Part 8)"	Chronologie
1997	"Oxygène (Part 8)"	Oxygène 7-13
1997	"Oxygène (Part 8)" (animated video)	Oxygène 7-13
1997	"Oxygène (Part 8)" (remix)	non-album
1997	"Oxygène (Part 10)" (Sash! Remix)	non-album
1998	"Rendez-Vous '98" (with Apollo 440)	Music of the World Cup: Allez! Ola! Ole!
1998	"Together Now" (with Tetsuya Komuro)	Music of the World Cup: Allez! Ola! Ole!
2000	"C'est la Vie" (feat. Natacha Atlas)	Métamorphoses
2000	"Tout Est Bleu"	Métamorphoses
2004	"Aerology"	AERO
2007	"Téo & Téa"	Téo & Téa
2007	"Vintage"	Téo & Téa
2007	"Oxygène (Part 4)" (penguins)	Oxygène: New Master Recording
2015	"Glory" (feat. M83)	Electronica 1: The Time Machine
2015	"If..!" (feat. Little Boots)	Electronica 1: The Time Machine
2016	"Exit" (feat. Edward Snowden)	Electronica 2: The Heart of Noise
2016	"Oxygène (Part 17)"	Oxygène 3
2018	"Robots, Don't Cry (movement 3)"	Equinoxe Infinity
2021	"Brutalism"	Oxymore
2021	"Epica"	Oxymore

== Cover version albums ==
- Oxygène - The Magic of Jean-Michel Jarre (performed by Ed Starink) (1991)
- The Symphonic Jean-Michel Jarre (performed by the City of Prague Philharmonic Orchestra) (2006)
- Re-Oxygène (2007)

== Books ==
- Jean-Michel Jarre (1987)
- Concert d'Images (1989)
- Paris La Défense – Une Ville en Concert (1990)
- Europe in Concert (1994)
- Concert pour la Tolérance - Paris Tour Eiffel (1996)
- The Millennium Concert - At The Grand Pyramids of Egypt (2000)
- Akropolis - Elpida (2001)
- Aero - Aalborg, Denmark (2002)
- Jean-Michel Jarre à Pékin (2004)
- Photo book - Live in Gdansk (2006)
- The Making of Water for Life (Hardback book, published by idesine) (2007)
