= List of Jean-Michel Jarre compositions with multiple titles =

This is a list of Jean-Michel Jarre compositions with multiple titles. Throughout the years, Jean-Michel Jarre has changed the titles to some of his original compositions, most often when performing them live. Jarre has also produced derivative compositions out of original works, using the same main melody.

This list relates the original titles and the new titles (and shows the first instance of each, whether it was an album or a concert). Titles which are mere translations from another language are not included. The table can be alphabetically sorted by either column.

Lines with a * denote a derivative composition using the same main melody, not just a retitling.

Original title (album/concert)	*	New title (album/concert)
"Akropolis" (Hymn to the Akropolis concert, Athens, Greece, June 19/20, 2001)		"Tribute to John Paul II" (Live From Gdańsk (Koncert w Stoczni))
"Akropolis" (Hymn to the Akropolis concert, Athens, Greece, June 19/20, 2001)		"Voyage à Pekin" ("Journey To Beijing" Jarre in China)
"Alive in Bourges" (Live Printemps de Bourges 2002)		"Aero" (Aero - Tribute to the Wind concert, Aalborg, Denmark, September 7, 2002)
"AOR (Bleu) 2002" (Le Printemps de Bourges concert, Bourges, France, April 12, 2002)		"Metallic Souvenir" (Live Printemps de Bourges 2002)
"La Belle et la Bête" (Gérard Lenorman single)	*	"Rendez-Vous 2" (Rendez-Vous)
"Black Bird" (B-side of "Popcorn" single, as Jamie Jefferson & Pop Corn Orchestra)	*	"Bridge of Promises" (Deserted Palace)
"Bourges 1" (Le Printemps de Bourges, Bourges, France, April 12, 2002)		"Paris Bourges" (Live Printemps de Bourges 2002)
"Bourges 2" (Le Printemps de Bourges, Bourges, France, April 12, 2002)		"Alive in Bourges" (Live Printemps de Bourges 2002)
"Children of Space" (Rendez-Vous in Space concert, Okinawa, January 1, 2001)	*	"Velvet Road" (Geometry of Love)
"Chronologie" (Album)		"Chronology" (Re-issue 2015)
"Coachella Opening" (Planet Jarre: 50 Years of Music)		"The Opening. Movement 8" (Equinoxe Infinity)
Cousteau on the Beach (promotional album title)		En attendant Cousteau
"Crazy Saturday" (unreleased)		"Metamorphoses 2002" (Le Printemps de Bourges, Bourges, France, April 12, 2002)
"Crazy Saturday" (unreleased)		"Body Language" (Live Printemps de Bourges 2002)
"Eldorado" (Images - The Best of Jean-Michel Jarre)		"Song for Tolerance" (Concert pour la tolérance, Paris, France, July 14, 1995)
"Eldorado" (Images - The Best of Jean-Michel Jarre)		"UNESCO Theme" (Water for Life concert, Merzouga, Morocco, December 16, 2006)
"Equinoxe 8" (Equinoxe)		"Band in the Rain" (Les Concerts en Chine)
"Equinoxe 8" (Equinoxe)		"Band in the Rain" (Jarre in China)
"Equinoxe 8" (Equinoxe)		"Small Band in the Rain" (Live in Beijing, Beijing, China, October 10, 2004)
"Extreme Wave" (unreleased from Electronica sessions)		"Oxygene 19" (Oxygène 3)
"Gloria, Lonely Boy" (Métamorphoses)		"Forbidden City" (Jarre in China)
"Gloria, Lonely Boy" (Métamorphoses)		"Ouverture France-Chine" (Live in Beijing, Beijing, China, October 10, 2004)
"Je me souviens" (Métamorphoses)	*	"Aero" (AERO)
"Industrial Revolution: Overture" (Revolutions)		"Shipyard Overture" (Live From Gdańsk (Koncert w Stoczni))
"Last Rendez-Vous (Ron's Piece)" (Rendez-Vous)		"Ron's Piece" (In Concert - Houston-Lyon)
"Magnetic Fields 1" (Magnetic Fields)	*	"The Overture" (Les Concerts en Chine)
"Magnetic Fields 5" (Magnetic Fields)		"The Last Rumba" (Les Concerts en Chine)
"March 23" (Sessions 2000)		"Space of Freedom" (Live From Gdańsk (Koncert w Stoczni))
"La Mort du cygne" (Gérard Lenorman single)	*	"Rendez-Vous 3" (Rendez-Vous)
"Music for Supermarkets 3" (Music for Supermarkets)	*	"Rendez-Vous 5 Part III" (Rendez-Vous)
"Music for Supermarkets 5" (Music for Supermarkets)	*	"Blah Blah Cafe" (Zoolook)
"Music for Supermarkets 7" (Music for Supermarkets)	*	"Diva" (Zoolook)
"My Name Is Arthur" (Rendez-Vous in Space concert, Okinawa, January 1, 2001)		"J'te flashe, J'te love" (Pierre Palmade single, new lyrics)
"Oxygene 12 (Remix)" (Odyssey Through O_{2})		"Oxygen in Moscow" (The Complete Oxygene)
"Oxygene 13" (Oxygene 7-13)		"Solidarnosc" (Live From Gdańsk (Koncert w Stoczni))
"Rendez-vous 2" (Rendez-Vous)		"The Shadow" (Once upon a Time performance, Copenhagen, Denmark, April 2, 2005)
"Revolution, Revolutions" (Revolutions)		"Education" (Water for Life concert, Merzouga, Morocco, December 16, 2006, new lyrics)
"Revolution, Revolutions" (Revolutions)		"Evolutions" (The Twelve Dreams of the Sun concert, Pyramids of Giza, Egypt, December 31, 1999 and January 1, 2000, new lyrics)
"Souvenir of China" (Les Concerts en Chine)		"Souvenir" (Live From Gdańsk (Koncert w Stoczni))
"Tout est bleu" (Métamorphoses)		"Light My Sky" (Aero - Tribute to the Wind concert, Aalborg, Denmark, September 7, 2002, new lyrics)
"Une alarme qui swingue" (Swatch the World concert, Zermatt, Switzerland, September 25/26, 1992)	*	"Chronologie 4" (Chronologie)
"Une alarme qui swingue" (Swatch the World concert, Zermatt, Switzerland, September 25/26, 1992)	*	"Chronologie 5" (Chronologie)
