= Planet Jarre: 50 Years of Music =

Compilation album by Jean-Michel Jarre
- Released: 14 September 2018
- Recorded: 1968–2018
- Genres: Electronica, ambient
- Label: Sony Music
- Producer: Jean-Michel Jarre

Jean-Michel Jarre chronology
Radiophonie vol. 9 (2017)	Planet Jarre: 50 Years of Music (2018)	Equinoxe Infinity (2018)

Planet Jarre: 50 Years of Music is a compilation album by French electronic musician and composer Jean-Michel Jarre, released on 14 September 2018 to commemorate Jarre's 50 years in the music business.

A total of forty-one tracks were chosen by Jarre himself for inclusion, among them two new songs ("Herbalizer" and "Coachella Opening"). Jarre remastered, and in some cases "retouched", the tracks himself. During the process, he decided that he had pursued four quite different styles of composition and therefore divided the project into four "universes" - "Soundscapes", "Themes", "Sequences" and "Explorations and Early Works". Some tracks were released in 5.1 surround sound.

== Contents and release ==
Jarre's new-mix "retouched" versions for the album comprised Chronologie Parts 1 and 4, Oxygène Parts 2, 8 and 20, Equinoxe Parts 4 and 7, "Bells" and "Fourth Rendez-Vous"; as well as edits of the 2004 AERO version of "Last Rendez-vous" and the intro section of "Ethnicolor", a three-minute "Waiting for Cousteau" excerpt, and the title track from 1988's Revolutions. (The latter was actually "Revolution, Revolutions", the title track from the 1991 Revolutions reissue, which had removed Kudsi Erguner's sampled ney flute part and substituted an Arabian singer and orchestra.)

Two fuller 2018 remixes were also presented. 1984's "Zoolookologie" appeared in a new trance-inspired version, and there was a reworking of the 1982 live version of "Magnetic Fields Part 2" from Les Concerts en Chine (with crowd noise removed and new synth overdubs added).

The "Explorations and Early Works" section of the album contained two previously unavailable rare or unreleased tracks. One was "Aor Bleu" (part of a suite of compositions Jarre had developed while studying musique concrete with Pierre Schaeffer at Groupe de Recherches Musicales in the 1960s, and which he'd previously revisited as part of a masterclass in Bourges during 2002). The other was one of the pieces from the super-rare Musique pour Supermarché album, 1983's single-copy art/collectable-commerce experiment. Although the latter track was billed as a demo, it was later identified as "Part 1" from the album.

All of the other rare tracks had been released seven years earlier on the Essentials & Rarities compilation. These comprised three more GRM-era pieces ("Happiness is a Sad Song" - originally produced for "Les Fêtes de la Jeunesse" in Reims in 1968 - and both sides of Jarre's 1971 debut single "La Cage/Erosmachine"), two tracks from 1973's Les Granges Brulees, and "Hypnose" (actually "Hypnose (Partie 2) Instrumental", the Jarre-written-and-performed b-side of a 1973 Dominique Webb synthpop single).

The compilation release was accompanied by the announcement of Equinoxe Infinity, a 40th anniversary sequel to his 1978 album Equinoxe, due for release on 16 November 2018.

== Track listing ==
Disc 1: Soundscapes
No.	Title	Original release	Length
1.	"Oxygène, Pt. 1"	Oxygène	7:39
2.	"Oxygène, Pt. 19"	Oxygène 3	5:01
3.	"First Rendez-Vous" (Remastered)	Rendez-Vous	2:55
4.	"Millions of Stars"	Métamorphoses	5:39
5.	"Chronology, Pt. 1" (new "retouched" mix/edit of second movement)	Chronologie	3:23
6.	"Oxygène, Pt. 20" (new "retouched" mix/edit, without intro)	Oxygène 3	5:30
7.	"Equinoxe, Pt. 2"	Equinoxe	5:01
8.	"Waiting for Cousteau" (three-minute excerpt - new "retouched" mix)	En attendant Cousteau	3:00
9.	"The Heart of Noise (The Origin)"	Electronica 2: The Heart of Noise	2:36

Disc 2 : Themes
No.	Title	Original release	Length
1.	"Industrial Revolution, Pt. 2" (Remastered)	Revolutions	2:22
2.	"Oxygène, Pt. 4"	Oxygène	3:46
3.	"Equinoxe, Pt. 5"	Equinoxe	3:45
4.	"Oxygène, Pt. 2" (New "retouched" mix)	Oxygène	5:25
5.	"Zoolookologie" (New 2018 remix/reimagining)	Zoolook	3:44
6.	"Bells" (New "retouched" mix)	Métamorphoses	2:05
7.	"Equinoxe, Pt. 4" (New "retouched" mix)	Equinoxe	5:32
8.	"Magnetic Fields, Pt. 2" (Remix of live version with new studio overdubs)	Les Concerts en Chine	3:58
9.	"Second Rendez-Vous (Laser Harp)"	Rendez-Vous	2:20
10.	"Fourth Rendez-Vous" (Remastered, new mix)	Rendez-Vous	4:09
11.	"Chronology, Pt. 4" (Remastered, new mix)	Chronologie	4:08

Disc 3: Sequences
No.	Title	Original release	Length
1.	"Coachella Opening (Note: Later released as "The Opening (Movement 8)" on Equinoxe Infinity)"	New track	3:58
2.	"Arpegiator"	Les Concerts en Chine	6:15
3.	"Automatic, Pt. 1" (featuring Vince Clarke)	Electronica 1: The Time Machine	2:58
4.	"Exit" (featuring Edward Snowden)	Electronica 2: The Heart of Noise	5:45
5.	"Equinoxe, Pt. 7" (New "retouched" mix)	Equinoxe	3:35
6.	"Oxygène, Pt. 8" (New 2018 remix/reimagining)	Oxygène 7-13	5:24
7.	"Stardust" (Featuring Armin van Buuren)	Electronica 1: The Time Machine	4:37
8.	"Herbalizer"	New track	3:26
9.	"Revolutions (Note: Mislabelled – actually a new retouched mix of "Revolution, Revolutions", title track from 1991 reissue of Revolutions)"	Revolutions	3:23

Disc 4: Explorations and Early works
No.	Title	Original release	Length
1.	"Ethnicolor" (New "retouched" mix/edit of introduction)	Zoolook	3:30
2.	"Souvenir of China"	Les Concerts en Chine	4:00
3.	"Blah Blah Cafe" (Remastered)	Zoolook	3:22
4.	"Music for Supermarkets (Demo Excerpt) (Note: Mislabelled – actually "Music for Supermarkets Part 1")"	Musique pour Supermarché	2:04
5.	"Roseland (Le pays de rose)"	Les Granges Brûlées	2:03
6.	"La Cage"	1969 45 rpm; collected in Essentials & Rarities	3:09
7.	"Erosmachine"	1969 45 rpm; collected in Essentials & Rarities	2:59
8.	"Hypnose (Note: Mislabelled – actually "Hypnose (Partie 2) Instrumental")"	1973 Dominique Webb 45 rpm; collected in Essentials & Rarities	3:27
9.	"La Chanson des Granges Brûlées"	Les Granges Brûlées	2:45
10.	"Happiness is a Sad Song"	Essentials & Rarities	5:51
11.	"Aor Bleu"	Previously unreleased	3:09
12.	"Last Rendez-Vous" (New "retouched" mix/edit)	AERO	4:08

== 5.1 Tracks ==
- Circus
- Equinoxe 2
- Equinoxe 5
- Exit
- Oxygène 15
- Oxygène 17
- Oxygène 2
- Stardust
- Switched on Leon
- Opening
- Souvenir of China
- Zoolookologie

== Formats ==
- Standard jewel-cased double CD
- Digipack double CD ("Deluxe version")
- Box set – Cabinet "Super Deluxe Fan Box", 2 CD, 2 cassettes, MP3 download option with 5.1 surround sound – limited to 4000 numbered copies
- Vinyl – 4 LP 180g, MP3 download option – limited to 3500 copies

== Charts ==
Chart (2018)	Peak position
Austrian Albums (Ö3 Austria)	22
Belgian Albums (Ultratop Flanders)	16
Belgian Albums (Ultratop Wallonia)	22
Czech Albums (ČNS IFPI)	99
Dutch Albums (Album Top 100)	23
Finnish Albums (Suomen virallinen lista)	45
German Albums (Offizielle Top 100)	5
Polish Albums (ZPAV)	20
Scottish Albums (Official Charts)	15
Spanish Albums (PROMUSICAE)	11
Swiss Albums (Schweizer Hitparade)	11
UK Albums (Official Charts)	21
