= Essentials & Rarities =

Compilation album by Jean-Michel Jarre
- Released: 30 May 2011
- Recorded: 1968–2002; compiled, edited and mastered in early 2011
- Genre: Electronic
- Length: 122:44
- Label: Disques Dreyfus
- Producer: Jean-Michel Jarre

Jean-Michel Jarre chronology
Oxygène: New Master Recording (2007)	Essentials & Rarities (2011)	Electronica 1: The Time Machine (2015)

Professional ratings
Review scores
Source	Rating
Allmusic	3.5/5 stars

Essentials & Rarities (previously announced as Memories & Rarities) is a compilation album by Jean-Michel Jarre, released in 2011. The double CD set consists of two distinctive CDs: Essentials, which is a compilation of Jarre's most famous work, and Rarities, which compiles tracks made before his ground-breaking album Oxygène.

Most of the tracks on Rarities had never been officially released on CD (apart from tracks from Les Granges Brûlées). The Rarities CD includes a selection of tracks from Deserted Palace, his first single "La Cage" and its B-side "Erosmachine", and the track "Happiness Is a Sad Song", which he composed in 1968 for "Les Fêtes de la Jeunesse" in Reims and is Jean-Michel Jarre's first musical release. Both "Happiness Is a Sad Song" and "La Cage / Erosmachine" were composed during Jarre's time at the Groupe Recherche Musicale.

The album was released in memory of Francis Dreyfus, the founder of Jarre's first record label Disques Dreyfus who died the previous year.

== Track listing ==
CD 1 – ESSENTIALS

1. "Souvenir of China" – 3:59
2. "Oxygene 2" – 3:12
3. "Arpegiateur" – 6:16
4. "Oxygene 4" – 4:14
5. "Equinoxe 4" – 6:42
6. "Calypso 2" – 2:28
7. "Zoolook" (original 1984 mix) – 3:52
8. "Magnetic Fields 1" – 5:20
9. "Magnetic Fields 2" – 4:02
10. "Equinoxe 5" – 3:55
11. "Industrial Revolution 2" – 2:22
12. "Rendez-Vous 4" – 3:59
13. "Gloria, Lonely Boy" – 5:30
14. "Oxygene 6" – 6:21
15. "Space of Freedom" (a.k.a. "March 23") – 8:02

CD 2 – RARITIES

1. "Happiness Is a Sad Song" – 5:53 (1968, not previously released on an album)
2. "Hypnose" – 3:29 (1970, Dominique Webb single)
3. "Erosmachine" – 2:58
4. "La Cage" – 3:23
5. "Chanson des Granges Brûlées / Song of the Burnt Barns" – 2:45
6. "Windswept Canyon" – 7:39
7. "The Abominable Snowman" – 0:52
8. "Deserted Palace" – 2:22
9. "Le Pays de Rose / Roseland" – 2:01
10. "Rain Forest Rap Session" – 1:40
11. "Black Bird" – 3:06 (1972, not previously released on an album)
12. "Music Box Concerto" – 2:41
13. "Iraqi Hitch-Hiker" – 2:25
14. "Les Granges Brûlées / The Burnt Barns" – 3:13
15. "La Cage Vitalic RMX" – 4:16 (2010, not previously released on an album)
16. "Erosmachine Vitalic RMX" – 3:45 (2010, not previously released on an album)

== Charts ==
Chart performance for Essentials & Rarities
Chart (2011)	Peak position
Croatian International Album Chart (HDU)	1

== Certifications ==
Region	Certification	Certified units/sales
Poland (ZPAV)	Gold	10,000^{*}
^{*} Sales figures based on certification alone.
