= The Concerts in China (concert) =

1981 concert tour by Jean Michel Jarre

The Concerts in China was a concert tour by Jean Michel Jarre in 1981. It marked the opening of post-Mao Zedong China to live Western music. Five concerts were held in the two biggest cities: on October 21 and 22 in Beijing, and on October 26, 27 and 29 in Shanghai. The five concerts were filmed and recorded for later commercial releases.

The concert was the first time Jarre had performed his music with other musicians with him on stage and featured the first use of a laser harp. The concerts featured all tracks from his latest album Magnetic Fields.

== Production ==
In 1981 (when Les Chants Magnétiques was released), the British Embassy gave Radio Beijing copies of Jarre albums, which became the first pieces of foreign music to be played on Chinese national radio in decades. The People's Republic of China invited Jarre to become the first western musician to play in post-Mao Zedong China. The performances were scheduled to run from 18 October to 5 November 1981. However, only 5 concerts were given in total, two in Beijing and three in Shanghai. The first, in Beijing, was initially attended mostly by officials, but before the concert began technicians realised that not enough power was available to supply the stage and auditorium. Chinese officials solved the problem by temporarily cutting power to the surrounding districts.

The stadium was almost full when the concert began, but as Beijing's buses stopped running at about 10 o'clock, about half the audience left before it finished. To boost the audience attendance for the second night, Jarre and his production team purchased some of the concert tickets and gave them to children on the streets (Jarre originally wanted the concerts to be free, but the Chinese authorities decided to charge between £0.20 and £0.50 per ticket). The event was notable for its lack of audience involvement; the Chinese were apparently unmoved by both the music and the light show, and applause was muted. At the second venue, Shanghai, Jarre encouraged audience participation by stepping into the crowd, which became much more exuberant than that in Beijing. Jarre in several of the concerts was accompanied by Chinese musicians playing traditional instruments. Recordings of the concerts, which featured one of Jarre's signature electronic instruments, the laser harp, were released as a double-disc LP in 1982.

== Set lists ==
First Concert in Beijing (Broadcast on Radio)

- Oxygene 1
- Oxygene 2
- Equinoxe 8
- Fishing Junks at Sunset
- Magnetic Fields 1
- Magnetic Fields 2

Following Concerts

- The Overture
- Arpegiator
- Equinoxe 4
- Fishing Junks at Sunset
- Band in the Rain
- Equinoxe 7
- Orient Express
- Magnetic Fields 1
- Magnetic Fields 3
- Magnetic Fields 4
- Laser Harp
- Night in Shanghai
- The Last Rumba
- Magnetic Fields 2

== Bibliography ==
- Remilleux, Jean-Louis (1988), Jean-Michel Jarre (English ed.), Futura Publications Ltd., ISBN 0-7088-4263-1
- Warwick, Neil; Brown, Tony; Kutner, Jon (2004), The complete book of the British charts: singles & albums (3rd ed.), Omnibus Press, ISBN 1-84449-058-0
