= AERO =

Compilation album / Remix album by Jean-Michel Jarre
- Released: 20 September 2004
- Recorded: 2004 at Croissy Studio
- Length: 73:42
- Label: Warner Music
- Producer: Jean-Michel Jarre

Jean-Michel Jarre chronology
| Geometry of Love (2003) | AERO (2004) | Jarre in China (2005) |

Professional ratings
Review scores
| Source | Rating |
|---|---|
| Release Music Magazine | (7/10) |

AERO (Anthology of Electronic Revisited Originals) is a 2004 compilation album by electronic musician and composer Jean-Michel Jarre, newly recorded in 5.1 surround sound and released by Warner Music on 20 September 2004. In addition to the re-recorded classic tracks, the album contains three new tunes (the title track which is a rework of "Je Me Souviens", from Jarre's 2000 album Métamorphoses, using the same main melody but with no vocals), and a bonus live track. All tracks are sewn together through surround-sound "Scenes".

The album includes a CD and a DVD; the DVD-Video features Dolby Digital and DTS audio, whereas the CD is in stereo, mixed to give a more spacious impression than usual. Jarre chose the DVD-Video format instead of the higher-quality DVD-Audio or SACD because he claimed that DVD-Video was the most widespread format, with the generalization of home cinema setups.

The video accompanying the music on the DVD show the eyes of French actress Anne Parillaud, listening to the music for the full length of the album. Johan Carlsson of Release Magazine considered that "this is a good introduction to Jarre's music and while the new tracks aren't much to write home about, its something for the old fans as well."

== Track listing ==
The DVD contains "Scenes" as separate tracks, while on the CD they are part of the track after which they follow.

=== CD ===
1. "Aero Opening / Scene 1" – 0:50
2. "Oxygene 2 / Scene 2" – 7:41
3. "Aero" – 3:09
4. "Equinoxe 8" – 1:24
5. "Oxygene 4 / Scene 3" – 5:05
6. "Souvenir of China / Scene 4" – 4:46
7. "Aerology / Scene 5" – 3:40
8. "Equinoxe 3 / Scene 6" – 6:33
9. "Equinoxe 4 / Scene 7" – 6:46
10. "Last Rendez-Vous / Scene 8" – 5:08
11. "Zoolookology / Scene 9" – 3:54
12. "Aerozone / Scene 10" – 4:56
13. "Magnetic Fields 1 / Scene 11" – 5:59
14. "Chronology 6" – 4:55
15. "Rendez-Vous 4 (Live Version)" (hidden bonus track; featuring Safri Duo; recorded at the 2002 AERO concert) – 7:34

=== DVD ===
1. "Aero Opening" – 0:16
2. "Scene 1" – 0:33
3. "Oxygene 2" – 7:12
4. "Scene 2" – 0:31
5. "Aero" – 3:09
6. "Equinoxe 8" – 1:26
7. "Oxygene 4" – 4:16
8. "Scene 3" – 0:32
9. "Souvenir of China" – 4:13
10. "Scene 4" – 0:50
11. "Aerology" – 3:02
12. "Scene 5" – 0:37
13. "Equinoxe 3" – 6:08
14. "Scene 6" – 0:26
15. "Equinoxe 4" – 5:40
16. "Scene 7" – 1:06
17. "Last Rendez-Vous" – 4:41
18. "Scene 8" – 0:27
19. "Zoolookology" – 3:34
20. "Scene 9" – 0:12
21. "Aerozone" – 4:51
22. "Scene 10" – 0:16
23. "Magnetic Fields 1" – 5:42
24. "Scene 11" – 0:17
25. "Chronology 6" – 4:54
26. "Rendez-Vous 4 (Live Version)" – 7:35

== Certifications and sales ==
| Region | Certification | Certified units/sales |
|---|---|---|
| France (SNEP) | Gold | 100,000^{*} |
| United Kingdom (BPI) | Gold | 100,000^{^} |
^{*} Sales figures based on certification alone.^{^} Shipments figures based on certification alone.
