= Equinoxe Infinity =

Studio album by Jean-Michel Jarre
- Released: 16 November 2018
- Recorded: 2018
- Studios: JMJ Studio, Paris
- Genre: Electronic
- Length: 39:55
- Producer: Jean-Michel Jarre

Jean-Michel Jarre chronology
Planet Jarre: 50 Years of Music (2018)	Equinoxe Infinity (2018)	Snapshots from EōN (2019)

Alternative cover

Equinoxe Infinity is the twentieth studio album by French musician and composer Jean-Michel Jarre, released on 16 November 2018 by Columbia Records. It is the sequel to his fourth studio release, Equinoxe (1978), released forty years prior.

== Recording ==
Jarre used both analog and digital instruments for this album. At first he was going to use the analog instruments that he used in Equinoxe, but then he changed his mind "because if I was once again the young guy I was when I began that LP 40 years ago, I would use the instruments available today." Among the instruments he used was the prototype of a small synthesizer that Jarre discovered on Kickstarter called the granular GR-1 made by the company Tasty Chips Electronics. This instrument was used to process a child's voice giving him a surreal and technological look on the track "If the Wind Could Speak (movement 5)". Jarre explained that he intentionally shortened it to make a link to "Band In The Rain" (from Equinoxe Part 8) from the 1978 album.

== Artwork ==
Jean-Michel asked an artist from Prague named Filip Hodas to make two covers based on Michel Granger's design, Le trac for the original album, one in green and blue to symbolize a peaceful and harmonious future, and another that reflects a more apocalyptic and dystopian world. "The album is the soundtrack to both these futures, with some parts sounding more uplifting and poppy and others more dark."

== Critical reception ==
Professional ratings
Review scores
Source	Rating
MusicOMH	3/5 stars
The Spill Magazine	4/5 stars

Aaron Badgley of The Spill Magazine wrote that "What Jarre does on this album, which makes it so great, is to develop a somewhat retro sound. This is electronic music from the ‘70s, with a little technology from today, and it adds to the overall album."

== Track listing ==
All tracks are written by Jean-Michel Jarre.

No.	Title	Length
1.	"The Watchers (Movement 1)"	2:58
2.	"Flying Totems (Movement 2)"	3:54
3.	"Robots Don't Cry (Movement 3)"	5:44
4.	"All That You Leave Behind (Movement 4)"	4:01
5.	"If the Wind Could Speak (Movement 5)"	1:32
6.	"Infinity (Movement 6)"	4:14
7.	"Machines are Learning (Movement 7)"	2:07
8.	"The Opening (Movement 8)"	4:16
9.	"Don't Look Back (Movement 9)"	3:36
10.	"Equinoxe Infinity (Movement 10)"	7:33

== Personnel ==
Personnel specified in the album notes:

- Jean-Michel Jarre – publication, composition, production and mixing
- Stephane Gervais – production assistance
- Patrick Pelamourgues – technical assistance
- David Perreau – mastering
- Filip Hodas – artwork (based in original by Michel Granger)
- Peter Lindbergh – portrait
- Eric BDFCK Cornic – graphic design

== Equipment ==
Adapted from liner notes:

- Yamaha CS-80
- ARP 2600
- EMS VCS 3, EMS Synthi AKS
- Eminent 310 Unique
- Roland Paraphonic 505
- Minipops
- Mellotron
- Korg PA-600
- Korg Polyphonic Ensemble P
- Korg MS-20, GRI
- Erica Synths Modular System
- OPI
- Modular Roland System 500 1 & 8
- Roland Boutiques
- Clavia Nord Lead 2
- Clavia Nord Modular
- Electro-Harmonix Small Stone
- Electro-Harmonix Electric Mistress
- Big Sky & Capistan
- Moog Sub 37
- Moog Taurus 1
- Animoog
- Arturia Arp 2600
- Arturia CS80
- Spectrasonics Omnisphere
- Native Instruments Kontakt
- Native Instruments Reaktor
- Synapse Dune 2
- Synapse The Legend
- Spitfire Audio Boom
- Native Instruments Replica XT
- u-he Satin
- ValhallaDSP
- Digisequencer

== Charts ==
Chart (2018)	Peak position
Austrian Albums (Ö3 Austria)	31
Belgian Albums (Ultratop Flanders)	20
Belgian Albums (Ultratop Wallonia)	17
Czech Albums (ČNS IFPI)	49
Dutch Albums (Album Top 100)	26
Finnish Albums (Suomen virallinen lista)	17
French Albums (SNEP)	20
German Albums (Offizielle Top 100)	11
Hungarian Albums (MAHASZ)	25
Italian Albums (FIMI)	84
Polish Albums (ZPAV)	14
Scottish Albums (Official Charts)	28
Spanish Albums (PROMUSICAE)	13
Swiss Albums (Schweizer Hitparade)	15
UK Albums (Official Charts)	33
