= Pin matrix =

Signal routing technique

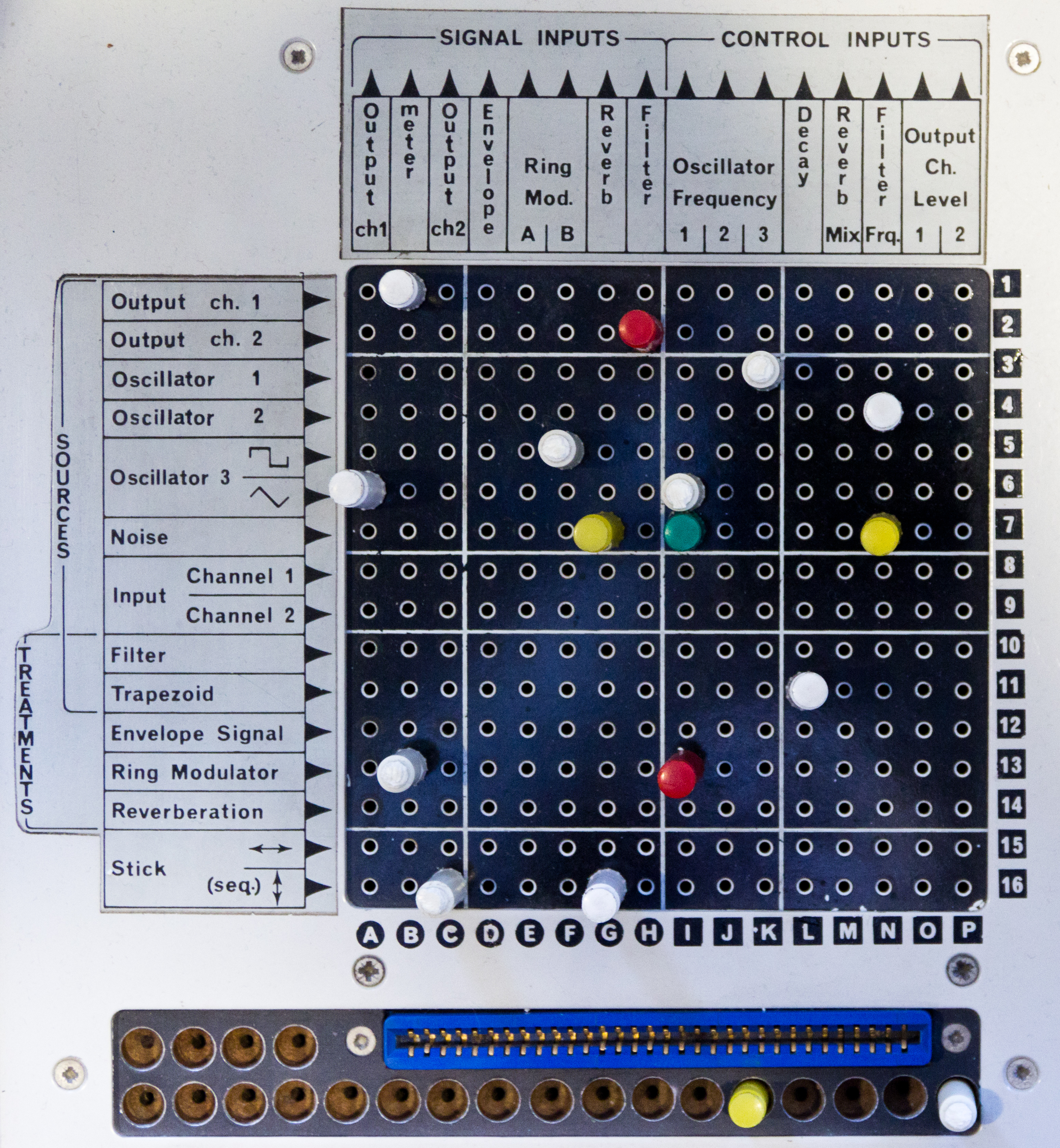
Routing matrix of an EMS VCS3 synthesizer.

The Pin matrix is a compact and visual to way to semi-permanently route signals or program devices, such as in early digital electronics or lighting control boards.

== Disadvantages ==
The number of patches that can be made is limited and the proximity of signal wires in the matrix can cause crosstalk.

== Synths that have used a pin matrix ==
Also known for being used to patch (program) some synthesizers. Generally inputs are on one axis and outputs on the other and a pin inserted where the two axes meet establishes a connection.

- ARP 2500
- EMS Synthi 100
- EMS VCS3
- EMS Synthi AKS
- ETI International 4600
- Maplin 5600
