= Oxygène 3 =

Studio album by Jean-Michel Jarre
- Released: 2 December 2016
- Recorded: 2016
- Genre: Electronic
- Length: 39:54
- Labels: Sony; Columbia
- Producer: Jean-Michel Jarre

Jean-Michel Jarre chronology
Electronica 2: The Heart of Noise (2016)	Oxygène 3 (2016)	Radiophonie vol. 9 (2017)

Singles from Oxygène 3
- 1. "Oxygène (Part 17)" Released: 4 November 2016

Oxygène 3 is the nineteenth studio album by the French electronic musician and composer Jean-Michel Jarre. Announced via a post on Jarre's Instagram account, the album was released on 2 December 2016, on the 40th anniversary of the original Oxygène album.

== Background ==
In 1997 Oxygène 7-13 was released, a sequel to the original 1976 album Oxygène. During the recording of his 2015 album Electronica 1: The Time Machine, Jarre composed a piece of music (later titled "Oxygene 19") that "made me think about what Oxygene could be if I was composing it today." In an interview with Billboard he stated: "What made the first Oxygene so different at the time, is probably the minimalist aspect, and the fact that there are almost no drums, and I wanted to keep this approach, creating the groove mainly with the sequences and the structure of the melodies only".

== Recording ==
The 1976 album was made on an 8-track multitrack with very few instruments. "I tried to keep this minimalist approach for Oxygene 3," Jarre stated. Jarre also stated that the album is separated into two distinct "light and dark" sides. "Oxygène (Part 20)" samples "Oxygène (Part VI)" from the original album within the sounds of wind and white noise that play at the beginning of the track. The album was recorded in just six weeks and mixed by Jarre using the Ableton Live audio software.

== Artwork ==
The album cover features a 3D model that recreates the original Michel Granger design used for the 1976 album. For the cover, Jarre asked Granger for permission to make a model based on his artwork, but from another angle. According to Jarre the artwork is "an ecological warning signal, dark and surreal, evoking both outer space and that of our vital living space." He also added that it had "become inseparable from the music."

== Release ==
Oxygène 3 was released on December 2, 2016, on Sony and Columbia labels, celebrating the 40th anniversary of the original Oxygène album. The album's first single was "Oxygene (Part 17)" and had a music video that combined live footage from the "Electronic World Tour" with "truly otherworldly" clips. It was released as a standalone album on digital download, CD, and LP, as well as in the Oxygène Trilogy package that brings together the three volumes of the Oxygène series and contains a coffee-table book.

== Critical reception ==
Professional ratings
Aggregate scores
Source	Rating
Metacritic	65/100
Review scores
Source	Rating
AllMusic	3.5/5 stars
The Arts Desk	3/5 stars
Classic Rock	5/10
Consequence of Sound	C
Financial Times	3/5 stars
The Music	3.5/5 stars
Release Magazine	3/10
The Skinny	4/5 stars
The Spill Magazine	4/5 stars
Uncut	7/10

Paul Simpson of AllMusic commented that "it's rich and adventurous but it never goes over the top, which is a relief." Mike Barnes of LouderSound wrote that "Oxygene 3 is a resounding success and shouldn't be seen as an exercise in fame by association with their own work, an extension of the 'brand', which was a sentiment that hung quite a lot about Tubular Bells II by Mike Oldfield and Thick as a Brick 2 by Ian Anderson". Nina Corocan of Consequence stated that "while full of good intentions, the album never quite finds its footing over the course of its seven tracks, inevitably failing to deliver a cohesive tone."

The Spill Magazine stated that "this album is full of unusual melodies that create emotions, and at times while listening oxygen begins to disappear in the room." In The Skinny, Gary Kaill rated it as "a minimalist — and exquisitely melancholy — wonder." John Paul of Spectrum Culture commented that "while not nearly the revolutionary release its predecessor was some 40 years ago, Oxygene 3 helps to reaffirm Jarre's place in the increasingly crowded world of minimalist electronic music that he helped pioneer." Thomas H Green of The Arts Desk wrote that "he retains the stripped-back, wafting instrumental prog-pop vibe of the album's predecessors, although the main indication it's an Oxygene album is the endless stoner-friendly wind noise whooshing smeared liberally over everything."

Financial Times writer Ludovic Hunter-Tilney described as "an ornate and luxuriant tribute to the analogue tones of vintage synthesisers, an artfully arranged constellation of electronic chimes, bleeps and whooshes." Fredrik Schlatta Wik of Release Magazine wrote that "the whole album lacks oxygen (pun intended). The sounds are fantastic, almost as a display of Jarre preset, but the lack of Jarresque melody, structure and build up is borderline annoying. Also despite being quite minimalistic, I found the mix and mastering a bit cluttered here, quite strained on at times and on few occasions and not overly pleasant to listen to."

== Track listing ==
All tracks written by Jean-Michel Jarre.

No.	Title	Length
1.	"Oxygène (Part 14)"	5:28
2.	"Oxygène (Part 15)"	6:40
3.	"Oxygène (Part 16)"	6:50
4.	"Oxygène (Part 17)"	4:20
5.	"Oxygène (Part 18)"	2:48
6.	"Oxygène (Part 19)"	5:45
7.	"Oxygène (Part 20)"	7:58

== Equipment ==
Adapted from liner notes of this album in vinyl:

- Eminent 310
- EMS Synthi AKS
- Small Stone Electro-Harmonix
- Electric Mistress
- ARP 2500
- ARP 2600
- Moog Sub 37
- Dave Smith Instruments OB6
- Mellotron D4000
- Korg Polyphonic Ensemble P
- Korg Mini Pops
- Metasonic
- Digisequencer
- Roland TR-808
- Animoog
- Teenage Engineering OP-1
- PO-12 Rhythm
- OP 24
- Ochord
- Elektron Analog Keys
- Access Virus
- Synapse Audio Software Dune VST
- Clavia Nord Lead 1
- Native Instruments Monark (thru NI Reaktor)
- RBlocks
- Reveal Sound Spire
- Xfer Records Serum
- Cognosphere
- Moog Taurus 1
- Micro Monsta
- Philicorda
- Spectrasonics Omnisphere 2
- Spectrasonics StylusRMX

== Charts ==
Chart performance for Oxygène 3
Chart (2016)	Peak position
Austrian Albums (Ö3 Austria)	47
Belgian Albums (Ultratop Flanders)	30
Belgian Albums (Ultratop Wallonia)	47
Dutch Albums (Album Top 100)	20
Finnish Albums (Suomen virallinen lista)	23
French Albums (SNEP)	50
German Albums (Offizielle Top 100)	34
Hungarian Albums (MAHASZ)	23
Polish Albums (ZPAV)	33
Scottish Albums (Official Charts)	44
Spanish Albums (Promusicae)	44
Swedish Albums (Sverigetopplistan)	46
Swiss Albums (Schweizer Hitparade)	14
UK Albums (Official Charts)	41
