= Kurzweil K2000 =

Digital synthesizer and music workstation by Kurzweil Music Systems

K2000
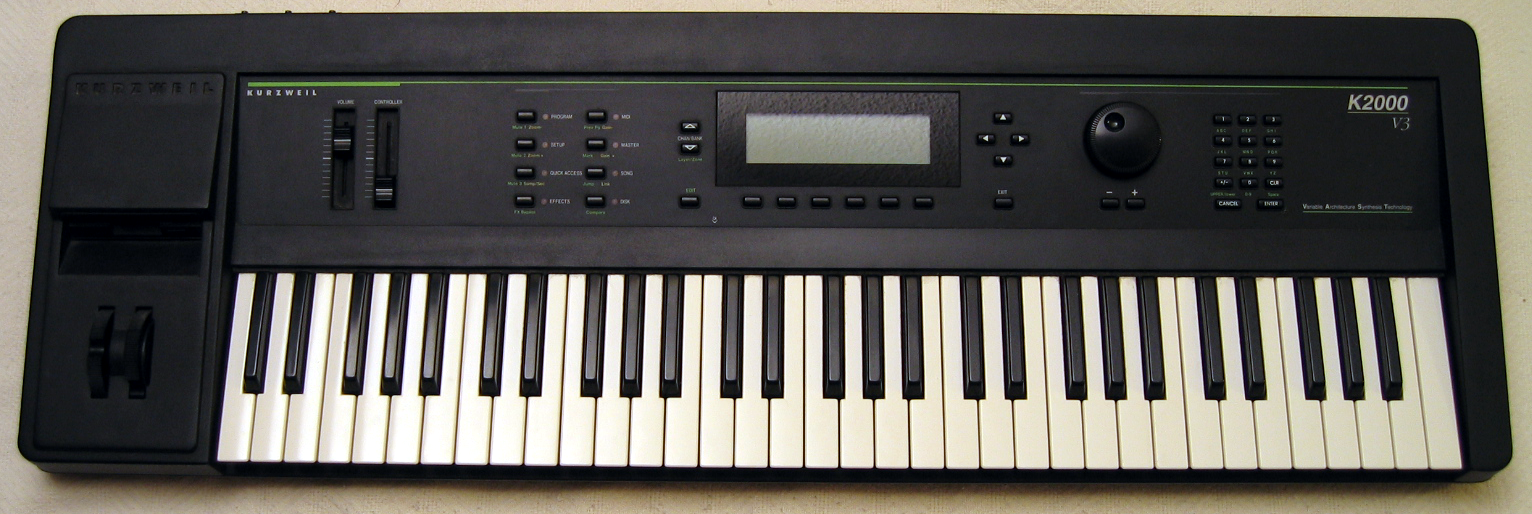
- Manufacturer: Kurzweil Music Systems
- Dates: 1991–2000
- Price: $2,995 US £2,769 GBP

Technical specifications
- Polyphony: 24 voices with dynamic allocation
- Timbrality: 16-part
- Oscillator: 8MB of 16-bit waveform ROM (expandable to 24MB), 1 sample-based oscillator plus up to 3 additional DSP-generated oscillators per voice
- LFO: 2 LFOs
- Synthesis type: Digital sample-based subtractive, sampling
- Filter: digital multi-mode with programmable and modulatable resonance
- Attenuator: 3 envelopes
- Aftertouch expression: Yes
- Velocity expression: Yes
- Storage memory: 199 factory ROM programs (up to 800 programmable RAM locations), 100 multi setups; up to 64MB of sample RAM, standard internal + external SCSI interface for mass storage
- Effects: multi-FX DSP with four simultaneous effects including reverb, chorus, flange, delay, graphic EQ, parametric EQ and four-tap delay

Input/output
- Keyboard: 61 keys
- Left-hand control: Mod wheel, Pitch bend
- External control: MIDI

The Kurzweil K2000 is a digital synthesizer and music workstation produced by Kurzweil Music Systems between 1991 and 2000 in a variety of standard configurations, including rack-mountable versions and models that came with 16-bit user sampling.

The K2000 features a complex digital synthesis architecture dubbed V.A.S.T., which stands for "Variable Architecture Synthesis Technology", Kurzweil's marketing term for the digital signal processing (DSP) sound processing system used in the K2000 and other members of its K2xxx series.

== Features and specifications ==
=== Variable Architecture Synthesis Technology (V.A.S.T.) ===
V.A.S.T. stands for variable-architecture synthesis technology. It is variable in that the user can select different signal paths, which contain different DSP functions, for use in creating and shaping a sound. V.A.S.T. also includes an extensive modulation system, similar in concept to that of analog modular synthesizers. A wide array of modulation sources can be assigned to various parameters within a signal path, and modulation sources can be combined to create new modulation sources.

=== Expansion options ===
- Sampling A/D input & digital I/O
- Orchestral and/or Contemporary PCM ROM blocks
- P-RAM Program memory expansion
- Sample RAM up to 64MB (30-pin SIMMs)
- Internal hard drive

=== Models ===
- K2000 - Original keyboard version with a total of six audio outputs, configured as a main stereo pair and four assignable outputs.
- K2000R - Rackmount version of the K2000 with a total of ten audio outputs, configured as a main stereo pair and eight assignable outputs. The K2000R can accept the same P/RAM and ROM expansion boards as the keyboard, although a different option board is required to add sampling capabilities.
- K2000S and K2000RS - Same as the standard keyboard and rackmount versions, but also shipped with the sampling option and 2Mb of sample RAM from the factory.
- K2vx (US $3,495) - A fully optioned version of the K2000 keyboard that included an expanded ROM sample set (incorporating the Orchestral and Contemporary ROM blocks) made up of 24 MB total (vs. 8 MB on a stock K2000), a factory-installed P/RAM expansion and new ROM presets (based on those in the Kurzweil K2500). The K2vxS (US $4,195) added the sampling option and 2Mb of sample RAM from the factory.
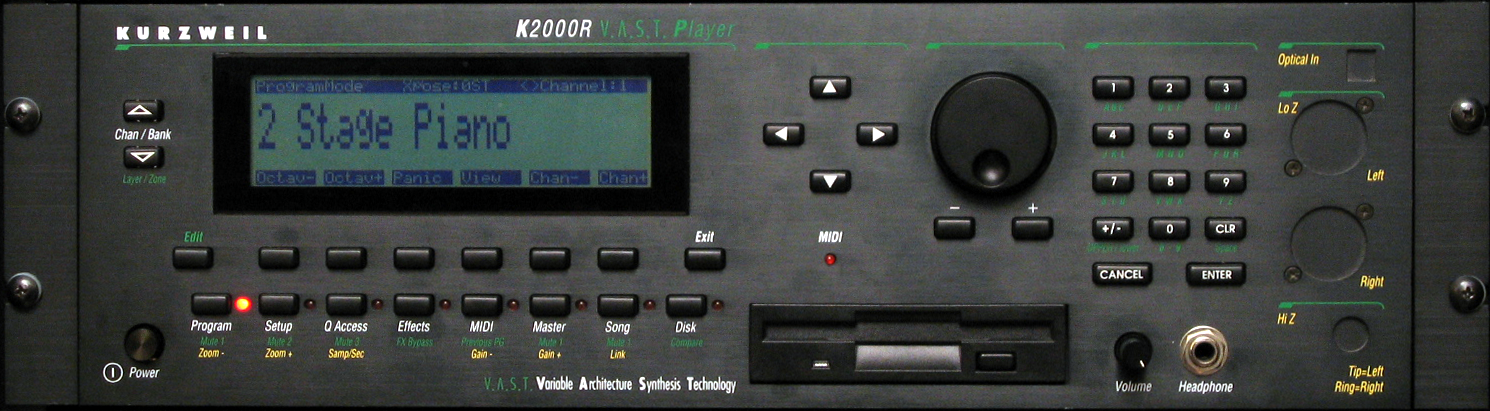
- Kurzweil K2000VPR
  K2000VP and K2000VPR (US $1,995 / $1,795) - "VP" stands for "V.A.S.T. Player" - Base models with the then-latest OS v3.54 and new presets based on those in the K2500. They had 2Mb of sample RAM, though the sampling option was not included but could be added.

== Notable users ==
- Robert Miles on Children
- Rick Wright of Pink Floyd
- Jean-Michel Jarre on Chronologie
- Jordan Rudess
- Depeche Mode
- Anthony "Shake" Shakir
- Hardfloor
- Tori Amos
- Stevie Wonder
- Nick Rhodes (Duran Duran)
- Bon Harris (Nitzer Ebb)
- Wumpscut
- Front Line Assembly
- KMFDM
- Mark Van Hoen
- LTJ Bukem
- Nine Inch Nails
- Massive Attack
- Vangelis
- The Wiggles
- Tangerine Dream
- Laurent Garnier
- Luther Vandross
- Lito Vitale
- Josh Silver (Type O Negative)
- The Postal Service
- Paul Shaffer (for the theme and music of the Late Show with David Letterman)
- Jay Frog
