= Jarremix =

Remix album by Jean-Michel Jarre
- Released: 10 July 1995
- Genre: Electronic, house, trance, techno, dance
- Length: 71:52
- Producer: Jean-Michel Jarre

Jean-Michel Jarre chronology
Hong Kong (1994)	Jarremix (1995)	Oxygène 7–13 (1997)

Professional ratings
Review scores
Source	Rating
AllMusic	2/5 stars
Muzik	3/5 stars

Jarremix is an album remixing music by Jean-Michel Jarre. The album was released in 1995. It largely consists of remixes of the tracks "Chronologie 4" and "Chronologie 6" from Chronologie, the then latest studio album by Jarre and released two years prior. The release of Jarremix coincided with Jarre's "Concert pour la Tolérance".

== About the title ==
The title "Jarremix" is a pun of the two words "Jarre" and "Remix". The one reads JarreMix, the other reads JarRemix.

== About the album ==
There are titles from the albums Chronologie (1993), Revolutions (1988), En attendant Cousteau (1990), Les Chants Magnétiques (1981) and Equinoxe (1978).

Most titles are enriched with a hint of techno, the style that achieved success in the early 90s.

The album was published again by Francis Dreyfus Music.

The first CD edition of Jarremix contained 11 tracks, only at the first week of release. The next one only includes 10, Oxygene 1 (Laboratoire mix) by Laurent Garnier (for more than 9 minutes) having been removed.

A limited edition of 500 copies was pressed on blue vinyl. This was a promotional edition prohibited for sale. It only has 8 titles.

The album release in 1995 coincided with Jarre's "Concert pour la Tolérance" (July 14, 1995) at the Eiffel Tower (1.25 million fans), celebrating Bastille Day and Unesco's year for tolerance. The images accompanied by the album, were used at the concert. They were also shown when Oxygene 8 was played in "Wetten Dass" (March 22, 1997), Rathausplatz Vienna, for the prelaunch of the new album Oxygene 7-13.

Several titles already existed. Equinoxe 4 (Deep mix) was played at "Europe in Concert" (in 1993, for a total of 650.000 fans), in London (Wembley Stadium, August 28), in Brussels (Atomium, August 24) and in Berlin (Waldbuhne, September 11). Calypso (Latino mix) belonged to the concert "Paris, la Défense" (July 14, 1990, for 2.5 million fans, also celebrating Bastille Day).

== Track listing ==
1. "Chronologie 6 (Main Mix)" – 8:04 (By Gat Decor)
2. "Chronologie 4 (E-Motion Mix)" – 5:59 (By Sunscreem)
3. "Equinoxe 4" (Deep Mix) – 4:44 (By Bruno Mylonas & Thierry Leconte)
4. "Chronologie 4 (S x S Mix)" – 6:36 (By Sunscreem)
5. "Revolution, Revolutions (Oriental Mix)" – 6:46 (By Bruno Mylonas & Bruce Keen)
6. "Equinoxe 7 (Ambiant Mix)" – 5:03 (By Bruno Mylonas & Bruce Keen)
7. "Chronologie 4 (Tribal Trance Mix)" – 5:37 (By Black Girl Rock)
8. "Oxygene 1 (Laboratoire Mix)" – 9:30 (By Laurent Garnier)
9. "Magnetic Fields 2 (Magnetic Mix)" – 4:10 (By Bruno Mylonas & Thierry Leconte)
10. "Chronologie 6 (Slam Mix 1)" – 8:06 (By Slam)
11. "Calypso (Latino Mix)" – 7:13 (By Bruno Mylonas)
