= Zoolook =

Studio album by Jean-Michel Jarre
- Released: 16 November 1984
- Recorded: 1983–1984
- Studios: Jean-Michel Jarre's home studio (Paris); Clinton Studio
- Genres: Electronic; electropop; new-age; collage
- Length: 37:58
- Labels: Disques Dreyfus; Polydor
- Producer: Jean-Michel Jarre

Jean-Michel Jarre chronology
Musique pour Supermarché (1983)	Zoolook (1984)	Rendez-Vous (1986)

Singles from Zoolook
- 1. "Zoolook" Released: 30 November 1984; 2. "Zoolookologie" Released: 31 May 1985

Zoolook is the seventh studio album by the French electronic musician and composer Jean-Michel Jarre, released in November 1984 by Disques Dreyfus. Much of the music is built up from samples of singing and speech in 25 different languages recorded and edited in the Fairlight CMI digital sampling synthesizer. The album spawned two singles: the title track and "Zoolookologie".

== Composition and recording ==
Zoolook was greatly influenced by Jarre's former mentor Pierre Schaeffer and Schaeffer's musique concrète, taking samples from everyday life and human voices in 25 different languages from all over the world. The sample-based approach, which had been initiated on Les Chants Magnétiques (1981) and continued on Music for Supermarkets (1983), was expanded on this album. Some fragments were recorded digitally by Jarre and then played back and edited on the Fairlight CMI. This process was done together with Frederick Rousseau for three months.

I've always been involved in ethnic music, though I thought the way a lot of people have been using ethnic music was a little superficial. Sometimes it works, like the Brian Eno stuff, it worked the first time, but for me what was more interesting was not making a particular statement about recording in Africa or in China, but taking some sounds and having exactly the same attitude as when you were in front of a Moog 55 or a modular system, replacing the oscillators with a bank of actors or people, treating them through the Fairlight or the EMS synth, and establishing an orchestration using only voices.

Some of the vocals were recorded during Jean-Michel's travels, while others are instead the result of his work with Xavier Bellanger, a French ethnologist who during his travels recorded "a large collection of tapes". For this album, Jarre used synthesizers like the Moog 55, ARP 2600, some by EMS, the LinnDrum machine, the Yamaha DX7, the Matrisequencer 250 designed by French sound engineer Michel Geiss for Equinoxe (1978), and the E-mu Emulator. The different languages as listed in the album's liner notes are: Aboriginal, Afghan, Arabic, Balinese, Bengali, Chinese, Dutch, English, Eskimo, French, German, Hungarian, Indian, Japanese, Malagasy, Malayan, Pygmy, Polish, Quechua, Russian, Sioux, Spanish, Swedish, Tibetan, and Turkish.

Much of the album's recording took place in Jarre's makeshift studio in Croissy-sur-Seine, France (credited as Croissy Studio). Sound engineer Denis Vanzetto joined Jarre's team, and later went to the Clinton studio, New York for recording American musicians chosen by Jean-Michel, among them guitarists Adrian Belew and Ira Siegel, bassist Marcus Miller, and percussionist and drummer Yogi Horton. After Jarre read in the American newspaper The Village Voice about an exhibition held by the avant-garde singer Laurie Anderson in a New York gallery, he called and invited her to the studio to listen to his demos. Seduced by Jarre's proposed idea of speaking a completely imaginary language, she agreed and provided the vocals for the track "Diva". Parts of the album, like the track "Blah Blah Café" and the second half of the track "Diva", were reworkings of material that had already appeared on the 1983 album Musique pour Supermarché. The album was mostly mixed by David Lord: final mixing began at Trident Studios in London, but Jarre wasn't satisfied with the results, so he and Lord finished mixing at Jarre's home studio in France.

== Release ==
Zoolook was released in November 1984, with a second edition, containing remixes for Zoolook and Zoolookologie, in September 1985. More aurally challenging than Jarre's previous works, the album was also somewhat less successful, reaching only number 47 in the UK album charts. Two singles from the album were released – the title track and "Zoolookologie". Both had a music video in 1985. The title track video was directed by Jean-Pierre Jeunet and featured twelve robots designed by Marc Caro, of which only one was kept after filming. The video of "Zoolookologie" was directed by Rod McCall and produced by Frank Coppola in London, UK. It "shows three models flirting with the artist in a provocative fantasy".

In 1984, the album won the Grand Prix du Disque award by L'Académie Charles Cros, and in April 1985 it won the best instrumental album of the year award at the Victoires de la Musique. In 2016, a contest called Zoolook Revisited was organized, in which amateur or professional producers were invited to share a piece using samples taken from the SoundHunters app. Tracks from winners such as Luke Vibert, Zeka Lopez, Mikael Seifu, Simonne Jones and KIZ were chosen by Jarre and included on the disc of the same name.

== Critical reception ==
Professional ratings
Review scores
Source	Rating
AllMusic	4.5/5 stars
Mojo	4/5 stars

At the time of its release NME said: "Strangely simplistic, this LP is like a union between Scary Monsters (and Super Creeps) and Kraftwerk on speed". Australian newspaper The Evening News commented that "is a phonetic symphony laced with catchy, funk-rock rhythms based on the intonations of various exotic languages".

In Montréal (Québec), Le Devoir felt that the beginning of the album was "a musical background both morbid and grandiose". In Mojo magazine, Phil Alexander listed it as one of Jarre's three key albums and wrote that "Jarre's rumination on internationalism also boasts a deliberate melodic focus that acknowledges the influence of synth pop, while pointing the way forward to greater experimentation – both in his own work and that of others".

AllMusic's John Bush stated that "Jean Michel Jarre combined an actual band and processed vocal samples – recorded in 25 different languages – with his rich, melodic synthesizer pop", described the album as "interesting throughout" and added that "the tracks with Jarre alone are often the best, reprising the classic Oxygène sound". "Zoolookologie" was described by Thom Holmes as a "fascinating exploration of samples both of voice and drums". In The Encyclopedia of Popular Music (2006), Colin Larkin named it a key moment in the history of sampling in popular music, writing that it "used sampled speech from all over the world, arranged into a musical collage, using the Fairlight."

== Track listing ==
=== First edition – original track list (1984) ===
Side one
No.	Title	Length
1.	"Ethnicolor"	11:41
2.	"Diva"	7:33

Side two
No.	Title	Length
1.	"Zoolook"	3:50
2.	"Wooloomooloo"	3:20
3.	"Zoolookologie"	4:20
4.	"Blah Blah Cafe"	3:21
5.	"Ethnicolor II"	3:52
Total length:		37:58

=== Second edition (1985) ===
No.	Title	Length
1.	"Ethnicolor"	11:41
2.	"Diva"	7:33
3.	"Zoolookologie" (Remix by François Kevorkian and Ron St. Germain)	3:46
4.	"Wooloomooloo"	3:18
5.	"Zoolook" (Remix by René Ameline)	3:51
6.	"Blah Blah Cafe"	3:21
7.	"Ethnicolor II"	3:52
Total length:		37:22

=== Third edition (1997 remaster) ===
No.	Title	Length
1.	"Ethnicolor" (new edit)	11:47
2.	"Diva" (new edit)	7:20
3.	"Zoolook" (new mix)	3:58
4.	"Wooloomooloo"	3:17
5.	"Zoolookologie" (new mix)	4:14
6.	"Blah Blah Cafe" (new edit)	3:26
7.	"Ethnicolor II"	3:54
Total length:		37:56

=== Fourth edition (30th anniversary, 2015 remaster) ===
No.	Title	Length
1.	"Ethnicolor" (3rd edition edit)	11:48
2.	"Diva" (3rd edition edit)	7:22
3.	"Zoolook"	3:52
4.	"Wooloomooloo"	3:18
5.	"Zoolookologie"	4:21
6.	"Blah Blah Cafe"	3:21
7.	"Ethnicolor II"	3:52
Total length:		37:54

=== Fifth edition (40th anniversary - new mastering) ===
The following is a track listing of the initial release on streaming platforms on November 8th, 2024, closely following the first edition from 1984 (both with regards to track lengths and the mixes of Zoolook and Zoolookologie). Due to multiple production errors (most notably audible in Ethnicolor) it was withdrawn and replaced in December 2024 with a remaster done from a different source.

No.	Title	Length
1.	"Ethnicolor"	11:41
2.	"Diva"	7:31
3.	"Zoolook"	3:52
4.	"Wooloomooloo"	3:18
5.	"Zoolookologie"	4:21
6.	"Blah Blah Cafe"	3:21
7.	"Ethnicolor II"	3:52
8.	"Moon Machine"	2:58
Total length:		40:54

Track listing as of December 2024. The source material used is the same as the third edition from 1997 (different edits of Ethnicolor and Diva, and a different mix of Zoolook)

No.	Title	Length
1.	"Ethnicolor" (3rd edition edit)	11:44
2.	"Diva" (3rd edition edit)	7:20
3.	"Zoolook" (3rd edition "new mix")	3:58
4.	"Wooloomooloo"	3:14
5.	"Zoolookologie"	4:17
6.	"Blah Blah Cafe"	3:25
7.	"Ethnicolor II"	3:54
8.	"Moon Machine"	3:00
Total length:		40:52

== Personnel ==
Personnel listed in album liner notes.

- Jean-Michel Jarre – keyboards, electronic devices
- Daniel Lazerus – sound engineer
- Laurie Anderson – vocals on "Diva"
- Adrian Belew – guitars, effects
- Yogi Horton – drums
- Marcus Miller – bass guitar
- Frederick Rousseau – additional keyboards
- Ira Siegel – additional guitars
- Xavier Bellenger – research
- David Lord – mixing engineer (all except "Zoolookologie")
- Rene Ameline - mixing engineer on "Zoolookologie"

== Equipment ==
Adapted from album liner notes.

- Linn LM-1
- LinnDrum
- Simmons SDSV
- Eminent 310 Unique
- Garfield Electronics Doctor Click
- E-mu Emulator
- Geiss Matrisequencer 250
- Fairlight CMI
- ARP 2600
- EMS Synthi AKS
- Moog 55
- Oberheim OB-Xa
- Prophet-5
- Yamaha DX7
- EMS Vocoder

== Charts ==
Chart (1984)	Peak position
Austrian Albums (Ö3 Austria)	28
Canada Top Albums/CDs (RPM)	86
German Albums (Offizielle Top 100)	24
Dutch Albums (Album Top 100)	27
Swedish Albums (Sverigetopplistan)	21
Swiss Albums (Schweizer Hitparade)	30
UK Albums (Official Charts)	47
New Zealand Albums (RMNZ)	35
Chart (2024–2025)	Peak position
Belgian Albums (Ultratop Wallonia)	140
Scottish Albums (Official Charts)	43
UK Album Downloads (Official Charts)	32
UK Progressive Albums (Official Charts)	8

== Certifications ==
Region	Certification	Certified units/sales
United Kingdom (BPI)	Silver	60,000^{^}
^{^} Shipments figures based on certification alone.

== Bibliography ==
- Duguay, Michael (2018), Jean Michel Jarre, Books on Demand, ISBN 978-284-993-324-4
- Andresen, Willi (2022), Rock & Talk: Band 2, Books on Demand, ISBN 978-375-579-632-9
- Jenkins, Mark (2007), Analog synthesizers, Elsevier, ISBN 978-0-240-52072-8
- Warwick, Neil; Brown, Tony; Kutner, Jon (2004), The complete book of the British charts: singles & albums (3rd ed.), Omnibus Press, ISBN 1-84449-058-0
