= Ekova =

- Origin: French
- Genres: World fusion, new wave, trance, electronica
- Years active: 1998–2008
- Labels: Six degrees records
- Members: Mehdi Haddab; Cyrille Dufay; Dierdre Dubois; Arash Khalatbari

Ekova was a French-based musical trio, headed by American-born Dierdre Dubois, who originated the name. "Its roots are in echo, and ova, signifying the feminine side," she explains. "But it's not supposed to have a literal meaning, just a beautiful sound. I wanted a word I'd never heard before." Much of her vocalizations share the linguistic experimentalism/artistry of the group's name, with occasional Celtic, English, and Persian utterances floating in between largely nonsensical syllables, as well as influences from Irish and English folk music.

== Discography ==
- Space Lullabies and Other Fantasmagore (2001)
- Soft Breeze & Tsunami Breaks (1999)
- Heaven's Dust (1998)
