= Les Concerts en Chine =

Live album by Jean-Michel Jarre
- Released: 5 May 1982
- Recorded: October 1981
- Genres: Electronic, ambient, world
- Length: 78:59
- Label: Disques Dreyfus
- Producer: Jean-Michel Jarre

Jean-Michel Jarre chronology
Les Chants Magnétiques (1981)	Les Concerts en Chine (1982)	Musique pour Supermarché (1983)

Professional ratings
Review scores
Source	Rating
AllMusic	4/5 stars

Les Concerts en Chine (pronounced [le kɔ̃sɛʁ ɑ̃ ʃin], English title: The Concerts in China) is a live album by Jean-Michel Jarre, recorded in 1981 and released in 1982 on Disques Dreyfus. It was recorded during Jarre's Concerts in China tour of Autumn 1981, which consisted of five Beijing and Shanghai concerts in China; this was the first time a Western pop artist performed in China after the Cultural Revolution.

The album is a balance of previously released tracks by Jarre, new compositions inspired by Chinese culture, and one rearranged traditional Chinese track, "Fishing Junks at Sunset" ("Jonques de pêcheurs au crépuscule").

The album consists mainly of live material, plus ambient sound recordings and one new studio track "Souvenir of China". Other new compositions recorded live include "Nuit à Shanghai", "Harpe Laser", "Arpégiateur" and "Orient Express". "Jonques de pêcheurs au crépuscule" ("Fishing Junks at Sunset") is a new arrangement of a very old traditional Chinese song known as the "Fisherman's Chant at Dusk", which was performed and recorded with The Peking Conservatoire Symphony Orchestra and is often wrongly attributed as being composed by Jean-Michel Jarre, misled by the album inlay.

Several of the tracks are misleadingly titled. The track labelled as "Magnetic Fields Part 1" is merely 30 seconds of table tennis sound effects and has no similarity with the studio track of the same name; in a 2018 interview with The Domino Elf, Jarre stated that he included the track as a joke. Meanwhile, "Band in the Rain" is actually part 8 of Equinoxe, "The Last Rhumba" is part 5 of Magnetic Fields, and "The Overture" is part 1 of Magnetic Fields slowed down.

The album was originally released as a double-disc LP, then as a double-disc CD. There was also a CD release in two separate volumes, with the cover color changed to blue (Vol. 1) and yellow (Vol. 2). In 1997, a one-disc remastered CD was released, made possible by reducing the total running time to 78:17 by reducing the gaps and audience noise between tracks. The remastering was done by Scott Hull at Masterdisk to the 96 kHz, 24 bit standard.

One of the album's original tracks – "Arpégiateur" – was used in the soundtrack of the film 9½ Weeks as well as in several mid-1980s episodes of the American soap opera Santa Barbara.

The album reached No. 6 in the UK charts #1 in Portugal and #76 in Australia.

== Track listing ==
=== First edition (1982) ===
Side one
No.	Title	Length
1.	"L'Ouverture" (The Overture)	4:47
2.	"Arpégiateur" (Arpegiator)	6:54
3.	"Equinoxe 4"	7:49

Side two
No.	Title	Length
1.	"Jonques de pêcheurs au crépuscule" (Fishing Junks at Sunset)	9:38
2.	"L'Orchestre sous la pluie" (Band in the Rain)	1:29
3.	"Equinoxe 7"	9:54

Side three
No.	Title	Length
1.	"Orient Express"	4:22
2.	"Les Chants Magnétiques 1" (Magnetic Fields 1)	0:21
3.	"Les Chants Magnétiques 3" (Magnetic Fields 3)	3:48
4.	"Les Chants Magnétiques 4" (Magnetic Fields 4)	6:49
5.	"Harpe Laser" (Laser Harp)	3:35

Side four
No.	Title	Length
1.	"Nuit à Shanghai" (Night in Shanghai)	7:02
2.	"La dernière rumba" (The Last Rhumba)	2:07
3.	"Les Chants Magnétiques 2" (Magnetic Fields 2)	6:30
4.	"Souvenir de Chine" (Souvenir of China)	3:54
Total length:		1:18:59

=== Second edition (1997 remaster) ===
No.	Title	Length
1.	"The Overture"	4:47
2.	"Arpegiator"	6:51
3.	"Equinoxe 4"	7:39
4.	"Fishing Junks at Sunset"	9:35
5.	"Band in the Rain"	1:23
6.	"Equinoxe 7"	9:52
7.	"Orient Express"	4:21
8.	"Magnetic Fields 1"	0:28
9.	"Magnetic Fields 3"	3:48
10.	"Magnetic Fields 4"	6:43
11.	"Laser Harp"	3:26
12.	"Night in Shanghai"	7:02
13.	"The Last Rhumba"	2:03
14.	"Magnetic Fields 2"	6:19
15.	"Souvenir of China"	4:00
Total length:		1:18:17

== Personnel ==
- Jean-Michel Jarre – Fairlight CMI, Eminent, Oberheim OB-Xa, Moog Taurus, EMS Synthi AKS, EMS VCS 3, Linn LM-1, Electro-Harmonix Micro Synthesizer, laser harp, Elka X-705
- Frederick Rousseau – MDB Polysequencer, RSF Kobol, Yamaha CS-60, Korg Rhythm, ARP 2600
- Dominique Perrier – Moog Liberation, Sequential Circuits Prophet-5, Eminent, Korg Polyphonique, RSF Kobol
- Roger Rizzitelli – Electronic percussion, Simmons electronic drum, Pollard Syndrums

=== Additional personnel ===
- Pierre Mourey – musical instrument coordinator
- Peking Conservatoire (Beijing Conservatory) Symphony Orchestra – Chinese orchestra on "Fishing Junks at Sunset"
- Huang Feili – orchestra conductor on "Fishing Junks at Sunset"
- Mrs. Li Meng, Mr. Wang Zhi – collaborating artists (possibly playing guzhengs) on "Fishing Junks at Sunset"
- Live recording by : René AMELINE & Patrick AUFOUR with the FLIGHT MOBILE.

== Charts ==
Weekly chart performance for Les Concerts en Chine
Chart (1982–2022)	Peak position
Australia (Kent Music Report)	76
Belgian Albums (Ultratop Wallonia)	115
Dutch Albums (Album Top 100)	9
German Albums (Offizielle Top 100)	35
New Zealand Albums (RMNZ)	46
UK Albums (Official Charts)	6
UK Album Downloads (Official Charts)	76

== Certifications ==
Region	Certification	Certified units/sales
United Kingdom (BPI)	Gold	100,000^{^}
^{^} Shipments figures based on certification alone.
