= Hong Kong (album) =

Live album by Jean-Michel Jarre
- Released: 1994
- Recorded: July–October 1993 in Europe & 11 March 1994 in British Hong Kong
- Genre: Electronic
- Length: 82:44
- Label: Disques Dreyfus
- Producer: Jean-Michel Jarre

Jean-Michel Jarre chronology
Chronologie (1993)	Hong Kong (1994)	Jarremix (1995)

Professional ratings
Review scores
Source	Rating
Allmusic	2/5 stars

Hong Kong is a live album by Jean-Michel Jarre, and released in 1994 on Disques Dreyfus, licensed to Polydor. Even though the album is called Hong Kong and has pictures of the event on its booklet, most of the tracks are from the Europe in Concert venues, except for "Souvenir of China" which is a special mix consisting of the Paris la Defense version and the actual track played in Hong Kong. Also, "Fishing Junks at Sunset" was recorded from the Hong Kong concert rehearsals. Some of the tracks already featured on the VHS release of the Barcelona concert the year before.

The running order is incorrect from both the Hong Kong show and the concerts in Europe from which the recordings were taken. For example Band in the Rain was actually always performed before Oxygene 4, not Rendez-Vous 4 as on the CD. The intro of Oxygene 4 can be heard in the background as the track fades out into Rendez-Vous 4 on the CD.

The non-album track "Digi Sequencer" is included on the CD, having been performed for the first time during the Europe concerts. This is the only official audio release of the track to date.

== Track listing ==
The first version released in 1994 included two CDs but since the 1997 remasters, the album has been issued on one CD, with "Hong Kong Hostess" and "Fishing Junks at Sunset - Part 1" removed.

=== First edition – original track list (1994) ===
==== Disc 1 ====
1. "Countdown" – 1:37
2. "Chronologie 2" – 6:37
3. "Chronologie 3" – 5:46
4. "How Old Are You?" – 1:17
5. "Equinoxe 4" – 4:46
6. "Souvenir of China" – 4:43
7. "Qu'est-ce-que l'amour?" – 0:52
8. "Chronologie 6" – 5:10
9. "Chronologie 8" – 4:49
10. "Where Are You Going?" – 0:52
11. "Oxygène 4" – 4:32

==== Disc 2 ====
1. "Hong Kong Hostess" – 0:35
2. "Fishing Junks at Sunset - Part 1" – 6:09
3. "Fishing Junks at Sunset - Part 2" – 5:31
4. "Sale of the Century" – 1:18
5. "Digi Sequencer" – 6:07
6. "Magnetic Fields 2" – 6:31
7. "Band in the Rain" (unplugged) – 2:26
8. "Rendez-Vous 4" – 6:23
9. "Chronologie 4" – 6:35

=== Second edition (1997 remaster) ===
1. "Countdown" – 1:37
2. "Chronologie 2" – 6:37
3. "Chronologie 3" – 5:46
4. "How Old Are You?" – 1:17
5. "Equinoxe 4" – 4:46
6. "Souvenir of China" – 4:43
7. "Qu'est-ce-que l'amour?" – 0:52
8. "Chronologie 6" – 5:10
9. "Chronologie 8" – 4:49
10. "Where Are You Going?" – 0:52
11. "Oxygene 4" – 4:32
12. "Fishing Junks at Sunset" - Part 2" – 5:31
13. "Sale of the Century" – 1:18
14. "Digi Sequencer" – 6:07
15. "Magnetic Fields 2" – 6:31
16. "Band in the Rain" (unplugged) – 2:26
17. "Rendez-Vous 4" – 6:23
18. "Chronologie 4" – 6:35

== Personnel ==
- Jean-Michel Jarre – Keyboards and synthesizers
- Francis Rimbert – Keyboards
- Dominique Perrier – Keyboards
- Sylvain Durand – Keyboards
- Laurent Faucheux – Drums
- Dominique Mahut – Percussions
- Michel Valy – Bass guitar (actually Guy Delacroix from the Europe concerts on most tracks)
- Patrick Rondat – Guitars
- Chuen Ying Arts Centre of Hong Kong – Chinese orchestra
- Cheng Chai-man – Conductor
- Hong Kong Opera Society – Choir
- Julie Lecrenais – Child soprano
- Miranda – Voice of time
