= Korg KR 55 =

Korg KR-55
- Manufacturer: Korg
- Dates: 1979

Technical specifications
- Polyphony: 12
- Timbrality: 12
- Synthesis type: Analogue Subtractive

Input/output

Korg KR-55 was a non programmable drum machine produced by Korg in 1979. It was the successor of the Korg Mini Pops series. It featured 48 preset patterns. The volume of each drum sound could be individually adjusted for each pattern.

The KR55B was a black chassis version released a in 1982 with twice as many rhythm patterns.

== Patterns ==
It featured 16 patterns including: Waltz, Samba, Rhumba, Bossa Nova, Tango, Slow Rock, Swing, Rock. There were also 16 intros and 16 fill-ins.
