= Images – The Best of Jean-Michel Jarre =

Images

Greatest hits album by Jean-Michel Jarre
- Released: 14 October 1991
- Recorded: 1976–1991
- Genre: Electronic
- Length: about 58 minutes, depending on release
- Label: Dreyfus
- Producer: Jean-Michel Jarre

Jean-Michel Jarre chronology
En attendant Cousteau (1990)	Images (1991)	Chronologie (1993)

Images – The Best of Jean-Michel Jarre is a compilation album by Jean-Michel Jarre originally released in 1991.

Unlike previous Jean-Michel Jarre compilation albums, Images is not just a collection of separate tracks. Instead, most of the tracks appear in edited form and segued together.

Apart from Jarre's best-known tracks, the album also contains two previously unreleased tracks composed for the canceled Teotihuacan solar eclipse concert scheduled for 11 July 1991, four new versions of older work, and one rare track "Moon Machine", which had previously appeared on a flexi disc of March 1986 issue of Keyboard and on a 12" single of "Rendez-Vous IV (Special Remix)" from that same year.

At the time of release two versions were issued with different track listings. In 1997 a new version was released with both track listings combined and a few extra tracks added. The compilation was also released in VHS format in 1991. The VHS contains all Jarre's videos from 1976 to 1991, except "Equinoxe 5".

== Track listing ==
Images includes 4 new versions of previously released pieces: "Magnetic Fields 2", "Equinoxe 4", "Rendez-Vous 2" and "Zoolookologie" (this track is missing on the 1991 International Release).

1991 International Release
No.	Title	Length
1.	"Oxygène 4"	3:09
2.	"Equinoxe 5"	3:21
3.	"Magnetic Fields 2" (New Version)	3:57
4.	"Oxygène 2"	3:11
5.	"Computer Week-End"	3:36
6.	"Equinoxe 4" (New Version)	3:12
7.	"Ethnicolor 1"	3:41
8.	"London Kid"	3:45
9.	"The Band in the Rain"	1:26
10.	"Orient Express"	3:26
11.	"Calypso 1"	2:59
12.	"Calypso 3 (Fin de Siècle)"	3:42
13.	"Rendez-Vous 4"	3:24
14.	"Moon Machine" (Rare Track)	2:58
15.	"Eldorado" (Previously Unreleased)	3:39
16.	"Globe Trotter" (Previously Unreleased)	3:29
17.	"Rendez-Vous 2" (New Version)	8:48
Total length:		1:01:43

1991 French Release
No.	Title	Length
1.	"Oxygène 4"	3:09
2.	"Équinoxe 5"	3:21
3.	"Chants Magnétiques 2" (New Version)	3:57
4.	"Oxygène 2"	3:11
5.	"Computer Week-End"	3:36
6.	"Équinoxe 4" (New Version)	3:12
7.	"Ethnicolor 1"	3:41
8.	"Zoolookologie" (New Version)	3:45
9.	"L'Orchestre Sous la Pluie"	1:26
10.	"Orient Express"	3:26
11.	"Calypso 1"	2:59
12.	"Calypso 3 (Fin de Siècle)"	3:42
13.	"Rendez-Vous 4"	3:24
14.	"Moon Machine" (Rare Track)	2:58
15.	"Eldorado" (Previously Unreleased)	3:39
16.	"Globe Trotter" (Previously Unreleased)	3:29
17.	"Rendez-Vous 2" (New Version)	8:48
Total length:		1:01:43

1997 International Release
No.	Title	Length
1.	"Oxygène 4"	3:09
2.	"Equinoxe 5"	3:21
3.	"Magnetic Fields 2" (New Version)	3:57
4.	"Oxygène 2"	3:11
5.	"Computer Week-End"	3:36
6.	"Equinoxe 4" (New Version)	3:12
7.	"Ethnicolor 1"	3:41
8.	"The Band in the Rain"	1:26
9.	"Orient Express"	3:26
10.	"Calypso 1"	2:59
11.	"Calypso 3 (Fin de Siècle)"	3:42
12.	"Rendez-Vous 4"	3:24
13.	"Moon Machine" (Rare Track)	2:58
14.	"Eldorado" (Previously Unreleased)	3:39
15.	"Globe Trotter" (Previously Unreleased)	3:29
16.	"Wooloomooloo"	3:18
17.	"Blah Blah Café"	3:21
18.	"London Kid"	3:47
19.	"Zoolookologie" (New Version)	3:46
20.	"Rendez-Vous 2" (New Version)	8:48
Total length:		1:12:10

VHS Release
No.	Title	Director	Length
1.	"Oxygène 4"
2.	"Equinoxe 4"	Gilles Amado
3.	"Magnetic Fields 2"	Julien Temple
4.	"Orient Express"	Andrew Piddington
5.	"Souvenir of China"	Andrew Piddington
6.	"Zoolook"	Jean-Pierre Jeunet – Marc Caro
7.	"Zoolookologie"	Frank Coppolla
8.	"Rendez-Vous 4"	Bob Giraldi
9.	"Revolutions"	Mike Mansfield
10.	"London Kid" (Live in Docklands)	Mike Mansfield
11.	"Oxygène 4" (Penguin Version)	Jean-Michel Jarre
12.	"Calypso 1" (Animation Version)	Andy Goff
13.	"Calypso 1" (Live in Paris)	Mike Mansfield

== Charts ==
Chart performance for Images – The Best of Jean-Michel Jarre
Chart (1991)	Peak position
Dutch Albums (Album Top 100)	85
Finnish Albums (Suomen virallinen lista)	15
French Albums (SNEP)	2
German Albums (Offizielle Top 100)	20
Spanish Albums (AFYVE)	7
Swiss Albums (Schweizer Hitparade)	23
UK Albums (Official Charts)	14

== Certifications and sales ==
Certifications for Images – The Best of Jean-Michel Jarre
Region	Certification	Certified units/sales
France (SNEP)	Platinum	300,000^{*}
Germany (BVMI)	Gold	250,000^{^}
Spain (Promusicae)	Platinum	100,000^{^}
United Kingdom (BPI)	Gold	100,000^{^}
Summaries
Worldwide	—	1,500,000
^{*} Sales figures based on certification alone.^{^} Shipments figures based on certification alone.
