= Electronica 2: The Heart of Noise =

Studio album by Jean-Michel Jarre
- Released: 6 May 2016
- Recorded: 2011–2016
- Length: 74:14
- Label: Columbia
- Producer: Jean-Michel Jarre

Jean-Michel Jarre chronology
Electronica 1: The Time Machine (2015)	Electronica 2: The Heart of Noise (2016)	Oxygène 3 (2016)

Singles from Electronica 2: The Heart of Noise
- 1. "The Heart of Noise, Pt. 1" Released: February 2016; 2. "The Heart of Noise, Pt. 2" Released: February 2016; 3. "What You Want" Released: March 2016; 4. "Exit" Released: 15 April 2016; 5. "As One" Released: 29 April 2016

Professional ratings
Aggregate scores
Source	Rating
Metacritic	58/100
Review scores
Source	Rating
AllMusic	3/5 stars
Evening Standard	4/5 stars
The Guardian	4/5 stars
Mojo	3/5 stars
musicOMH	3.5/5 stars
Pitchfork	4.9/10
Q	2/5 stars
Release Magazine	7/10

Electronica 2: The Heart of Noise is the eighteenth studio album by French electronic musician and composer Jean-Michel Jarre, released on 6 May 2016 by Columbia Records. It is the second of a two-part album (the first being Electronica 1: The Time Machine) that is based around collaborations with other electronic musicians from a wide range of decades and styles.

Electronica 1 included artists such as Vince Clarke, Gesaffelstein, M83, Armin van Buuren, John Carpenter, 3D (of Massive Attack), Pete Townshend, Tangerine Dream, and others, while Electronica 2 includes collaborations with Pet Shop Boys, Rone, Julia Holter, Primal Scream, Gary Numan, Hans Zimmer, Edward Snowden, Peaches, Sébastien Tellier, The Orb, Siriusmo, Yello, Jeff Mills, Cyndi Lauper and Christophe. In all, the two-album collaboration has some 30 collaborators, and Jarre has described it as his "most ambitious project."

The name of the album, its album art as well as its full track and collaboration listings were revealed to the public on 19 February 2016. The album was nominated for the 2017 Victoires de la musique award in France, in the Album de musiques électroniques ou dance category.

== Track listing ==
No.	Title	Writer(s)	Length
1.	"The Heart of Noise, Pt. 1" (with Rone)	Jarre, Erwan Castex	4:26
2.	"The Heart of Noise, Pt. 2"	Jarre	4:10
3.	"Brick England" (with Pet Shop Boys)	Jarre, Neil Tennant, Chris Lowe	4:01
4.	"These Creatures" (with Julia Holter)	Jarre, Julia Holter	3:40
5.	"As One" (with Primal Scream)	Jarre, Andrew Innes, Bobby Gillespie, Robert Young	3:58
6.	"Here For You" (with Gary Numan)	Jarre, Gary Numan	3:59
7.	"Electrees" (with Hans Zimmer)	Jarre, Hans Zimmer	4:10
8.	"Exit" (with Edward Snowden)	Jarre	6:19
9.	"What You Want" (with Peaches)	Jarre, Merrill Nisker	3:27
10.	"Gisele" (with Sébastien Tellier)	Jarre, Sébastien Tellier	3:43
11.	"Switch on Leon" (with The Orb)	Jarre, Alex Paterson, Thomas Fehlmann	4:43
12.	"Circus" (with Siriusmo)	Jarre, Moritz Friedrich	3:09
13.	"Why This, Why That and Why" (with Yello)	Jarre, Dieter Meier, Boris Blank	3:58
14.	"The Architect" (with Jeff Mills)	Jarre, Jeff Mills	4:43
15.	"Swipe to the Right" (with Cyndi Lauper)	Jarre, Cyndi Lauper, Carmen Cacciatore	4:54
16.	"Walking the Mile" (with Christophe)	Jarre, Daniel Bevilacqua	4:52
17.	"Falling Down"	Jarre	3:23
18.	"The Heart of Noise (The Origin)"	Jarre	2:39
Total length:			74:14

- "As One" contains samples from "Come Together" by Primal Scream

== Charts ==
Chart (2016)	Peak position
Austrian Albums (Ö3 Austria)	22
Belgian Albums (Ultratop Flanders)	14
Belgian Albums (Ultratop Wallonia)	8
Czech Albums (IFPI)	3
Dutch Albums (Album Top 100)	14
Finnish Albums (Suomen virallinen lista)	19
French Albums (SNEP)	9
German Albums (Offizielle Top 100)	12
Hungarian Albums (MAHASZ)	15
Irish Albums (IRMA)	47
Italian Albums (FIMI)	25
Norwegian Albums (VG-lista)	27
Polish Albums (ZPAV)	9
Spanish Albums (Promusicae)	12
Swedish Albums (Sverigetopplistan)	27
Swiss Albums (Schweizer Hitparade)	5
UK Albums (Official Charts)	8

== Certifications ==
Region	Certification	Certified units/sales
Poland (ZPAV)	Platinum	20,000^{‡}
^{‡} Sales+streaming figures based on certification alone.
