= MDB Polysequencer =

Eight track polyphonic sequencer

- Manufacturer: MDB
- Dates: 1980

Technical specifications
- Polyphony: 8 notes
- Timbrality: Multitimbral
- Storage memory: Cartridges or diskettes.

Input/output
- Keyboard: None (rack mounted)

The MDB Polysequencer is an eight track polyphonic sequencer manufactured in France and released in 1980.

It was designed by Eric Lamy. The unit could be backed up on cartridges or diskettes. Each sequence can be entered note by note, or saved with the keyboard that is supplied with the unit.

== Notable users ==
- Jean-Michel Jarre
- Saint Preux
