= Les Chants Magnétiques =

1981 studio album by Jean-Michel Jarre

Studio album by Jean-Michel Jarre
- Released: 20 May 1981
- Studios: Croissy Studio, France
- Genres: Electronic; Synth-pop
- Length: 35:53
- Label: Disques Dreyfus
- Producer: Jean-Michel Jarre

Jean-Michel Jarre chronology
Equinoxe (1978)	Les Chants Magnétiques (1981)	Les Concerts en Chine (1982)

Singles from Les Chants Magnétiques
- 1. "Les Chants Magnétiques, Part 2" Released: April 1981; 2. "Les Chants Magnétiques, Part 4 (Remix)" Released: November 1981; 3. "The Last Rumba" Released: 1981 (NL)

Les Chants Magnétiques (English title: Magnetic Fields) is the fifth studio album by French electronic musician and composer Jean-Michel Jarre, released on Disques Dreyfus on 20 May 1981. The album reached number six in the United Kingdom, number 98 in the United States and number 76 in Australia.

== Title ==
The title of the album is a play on words in the French language. The literal English translation of the French title, "Les Chants Magnétiques", is "Magnetic Songs". However, the French word for 'fields' (champs) is a homophone of the French word for 'songs' (chants), so in French, if the title is spoken out loud, it can be interpreted as either magnetic fields or as magnetic songs. (Les Champs magnétiques was a surrealist book published in 1920.)

The English title, "Magnetic Fields", is a literal translation of "les champs magnétiques" rather than "les chants magnétiques", and the pun in the original French title is lost in translation.

== Composition and recording ==
The album is one of the first to use sounds from the Fairlight CMI. Its digital technology allowed Jarre to continue his earlier sonic experimentation in new ways. He also used instruments from the EMS company, among them the Synthi AKS, the VCS 3 and the Vocoder 1000.

"Les Chants Magnétiques (Part 1)" is divided into three different movements, "kicking off with an exhibitionist, cocksure first movement that seems to keep reaching to the sky for yet more key changes, followed by the swishy human samples and surreality of the second, and the mechanical chuntering and sonic lack of constraint of the third".

In minimalist piece "Les Chants Magnétiques (Part 3)" employs sounds from a toy box, and Jarre's collaborator Michel Geiss recorded the sounds produced by trains that would be used in the album. Les Chants Magnétiques was recorded and mixed by Jean-Pierre Janiaud assisted by Patrick Foulon at Croissy studio, the cover was designed by Remy Magron.

== Release ==
Les Chants Magnétiques was released on 20 May 1981 in Europe, on 29 May in the UK, and on 15 June in the US. It sold a reported 200,000 units in France alone by the beginning of July. In that same year, the British Embassy gave Radio Beijing copies of his albums, which became the first pieces of foreign music to be played on Chinese national radio in decades. China invited Jarre to become the first western musician to play there since the death of Mao Zedong.

== Critical reception ==
Professional ratings
Review scores
Source	Rating
AllMusic	4/5 stars
Record Mirror	2/5 stars
Smash Hits	7/10

Contemporary reception of the album was generally positive. Cashbox wrote that Magnetic Fields "is Jarre's most subtle work yet, being a bit busier than Oxygène and more textural than Equinoxe". In Smash Hits, Johnny Black stated that the album "proves more energetic than either of its two mega-selling predecessors. It is, arguably, wallpaper music, but his creative use of Latin and African rhythms ... moves it all up a notch."

Simon Tebbutt of Record Mirror described the album as "nullifying, stultifying and ultimately BORING". In an AllMusic retrospective review, writer John Bush commented that: "It's often just as melodic and inventive as Oxygène, though not as consistently creative."

== Track listing ==
Side one
No.	Title	Length
1.	"Les Chants Magnétiques Part 1"	17:50

Side two
No.	Title	Length
1.	"Les Chants Magnétiques Part 2"	3:59
2.	"Les Chants Magnétiques Part 3"	4:15
3.	"Les Chants Magnétiques Part 4"	6:18
4.	"Les Chants Magnétiques Part 5 – La Dernière Rumba" (The Last Rumba)	3:30
Total length:		35:52

== Equipment ==
- MDB Polysequencer
- RSF Kobol
- Oberheim OB-X
- ARP 2600
- Fairlight CMI
- EMS Synthi AKS
- EMS Synthi VCS3
- Korg KR 55
- Elka 707
- Eminent 310U
- Moog Taurus Pedal Synthesizer
- Electronic Music Studios (EMS) Vocoder 1000
- Korg VC-10
- Electro-Harmonix Echoflanger

== Charts ==
=== Weekly charts ===
Chart (1981)	Peak position
Australian Albums (Kent Music Report)	76
Austrian Albums (Ö3 Austria)	4
Dutch Albums (Album Top 100)	5
French Albums (SNEP)	4
Finnish Albums (Suomen virallinen lista)	20
German Albums (Offizielle Top 100)	9
New Zealand Albums (RMNZ)	22
Norwegian Albums (VG-lista)	20
Swedish Albums (Sverigetopplistan)	22
UK Albums (Official Charts)	6
US Billboard 200	98

=== Year-end charts ===
Chart (1981)	Position
German Albums (Offizielle Top 100)	32

== Certifications and sales ==
Region	Certification	Certified units/sales
France	—	200,000
Japan	—	20,000
Netherlands (NVPI)	Gold	50,000^{^}
Spain (Promusicae)	Gold	50,000^{^}
Sweden	—	10,000
United Kingdom (BPI)	Gold	100,000^{^}
^{^} Shipments figures based on certification alone.

== Bibliography ==
- Remilleux, Jean-Louis (1988), Jean-Michel Jarre (English ed.), Futura Publications Ltd., ISBN 0-7088-4263-1
