= Chronologie =

Studio album by Jean-Michel Jarre
- Released: 24 May 1993
- Studio: Croissy studio
- Length: 42:07
- Label: Disques Dreyfus
- Producer: Jean Michel Jarre

Jean-Michel Jarre chronology
Images - The Best of Jean Michel Jarre (1991)	Chronologie (1993)	Hong Kong (1994)

Professional ratings
Review scores
Source	Rating
AllMusic	3/5 stars

Chronologie (English title: Chronology) is the eleventh studio album by French electronic musician and composer Jean-Michel Jarre, and was released on Disques Dreyfus with license to Polydor in 1993. Its concept is based on the book A Brief History of Time by Stephen Hawking, as credited in the CD booklet.

The album peaked at Number 11 in the UK charts and the album cover art was created by long-time collaborator Michel Granger. The tracks Chronologie Part 4 and Chronologie Part 5 were originally composed for the Swiss watchmaker Swatch, and also featured at Jarre's concert in Zermatt (1992), which they sponsored. The beeping tones of Chronologie Part 4 were also featured in the Swatch Musicall watch (1993).

Chronologie was performed at a series of 16 performances across Europe called Europe in Concert. These were on a smaller scale than his previous concerts, featuring a miniature skyline, laser imaging and fireworks. Locations included Lausanne, Mont St Michel, London, Manchester, Barcelona, Seville, Brussels and the Versailles Palace near Paris.

A couple of remixes have been released as well: Chronologie Part 4 by Praga Khan, Sunscreem and Jamie Petrie, Chronologie Part 6 by Slam and Gat Decor, plus Chronologie Part 8 by Michel Geiss.

== Composition ==
The album features Jarre's traditional collection of instruments like the ARP 2600 and Minimoog, as well as newer synthesisers such as the Roland JD-800 and the Kurzweil K2000. Chronologie was recorded and mixed in Croissy studio.

"Chronologie Part 4"
The opening few moments of "Chronologie Part 4"

In the state of mind I did Chronologie, it's quite close to what I did for Oxygène, using a lot of the old synthesizers of the '70s, like the Moog synthesizer — which I consider to be the Stradivarius of electronic music — mixed with the digital sound and the beat of the dance scene of the '90s. In a sense, Chronologie is a kind of mixture between the sounds of the '70s and the sounds of the '90s.

== Track listing ==
All tracks by Jean Michel Jarre.

Side one
No.	Title	Length
1.	"Chronologie Part 1"	10:51
2.	"Chronologie Part 2"	6:05
3.	"Chronologie Part 3"	3:59

Side two
No.	Title	Length
1.	"Chronologie Part 4"	3:59
2.	"Chronologie Part 5"	5:34
3.	"Chronologie Part 6"	3:45
4.	"Chronologie Part 7"	2:17
5.	"Chronologie Part 8"	5:33

== Personnel ==
Personnel Listed in album liner notes:

- Jean Michel Jarre – Digisequencer, Kurzweil K2000, Mini Moog, ARP 2600, Akai MPC60, Akai S1000, EMS Synthi AKS, JD 800, Korg O1/W, Roland TR-909, DR 660, Synthex, Eminent 310, JP 8, DJ 70, Vocalist, Fairlight CMI
- Francis Rimbert – additional keyboards
- Michel Geiss – additional keyboards, artistic collaboration
- Dominique Perrier – additional keyboards
- Patrick Rondat – guitar
- Patrick Pelamourges – technical assistance

== Charts ==
=== Weekly charts ===
Weekly chart performance for Chronologie
Chart (1993)	Peak
Austrian Albums (Ö3 Austria)	32
Dutch Albums (Album Top 100)	56
Finnish Albums (Suomen virallinen lista)	10
German Albums (Offizielle Top 100)	50
Hungarian Albums (MAHASZ)	4
Spanish Albums (AFYVE)	6
Swedish Albums (Sverigetopplistan)	25
Swiss Albums (Schweizer Hitparade)	21
UK Albums (Official Charts)	11

=== Year-end charts ===
1993 year-end chart performance for Chronologie
Chart (1993)	Rank
Spanish Albums (AFYVE)	8

== Certifications ==
Certifications and sales for Chronologie
Region	Certification	Certified units/sales
Spain (Promusicae)	3× Platinum	300,000^{^}
Switzerland (IFPI Switzerland)	Platinum	50,000^{^}
^{^} Shipments figures based on certification alone.
