= En attendant Cousteau =

Studio album by Jean-Michel Jarre
- Released: 11 June 1990
- Studios: Coral Sound studio, Port of Spain, Trinidad and Tobago (Note: Tracks 1–3); Croissy studio, Paris (Note: Track 4)
- Length: 68:57
- Label: Disques Dreyfus
- Producer: Jean-Michel Jarre

Jean-Michel Jarre chronology
Revolutions (1988)	En attendant Cousteau (1990)	Images - The Best of Jean-Michel Jarre (1991)

Professional ratings
Review scores
Source	Rating
AllMusic	4.5/5 stars

En attendant Cousteau (English title: Waiting for Cousteau) is the tenth studio album by French electronic musician and composer Jean-Michel Jarre, released on Disques Dreyfus, licensed to Polydor. The title is a reference to the play Waiting for Godot.

Originally, Jarre intended to call it 'Cousteau sur la plage (Cousteau on the beach)', but it was changed at the last moment. A promotional tape contained this title.

The album was dedicated to Jacques-Yves Cousteau and was released on his 80th birthday 11 June 1990. AllMusic described the album as "groundbreaking stuff", due to its stylistic differences from his other albums. The album reached Number 14 in the UK charts.

En attendant Cousteau is divided into two distinct stylistic halves: the first three pieces titled "Calypso" and the title track, an ambient piece which was used in the soundtrack of a 1991 documentary entitled "Palawan: Le dernier refuge" by Cousteau and Jarre. However title track from documentary did not appear on En attendant Cousteau.

The title track was also played at Jarre's exposition Concert d'images in Paris, 1989. According to a Jarre fan-magazine, it was created via an app on an Atari Mega-ST, on which Jarre programmed 16 starting notes. He apparently got the idea from the book Dirk Gently's Holistic Detective Agency by Douglas Adams. He denied it in a later interview, claiming all notes are actually played by hand, noting however that the track includes some time-stretched samples mixed into the background.

Jarre performed the album for about 2.5 million people at the Paris La Défense concert on 14 july 1990, featuring The Amoco Renegades, a steel-drum band from Trinidad and Tobago.

== Track listing ==
=== CD edition ===
All music is composed by Jean-Michel Jarre.

No.	Title	Length
1.	"Calypso Part 1"	8:24
2.	"Calypso Part 2"	7:10
3.	"Calypso Part 3 (Fin de Siècle)" (End of the Century)	6:28
4.	"En attendant Cousteau" (Waiting for Cousteau)	46:55
Total length:		1:08:57

=== Vinyl and cassette edition ===
Side one
No.	Title	Length
1.	"Calypso Part 1"	8:24
2.	"Calypso Part 2"	7:10
3.	"Calypso Part 3 (Fin de Siècle)"	6:28

Side two
No.	Title	Length
1.	"En attendant Cousteau"	22:00
Total length:		44:02

== Personnel ==
Personnel listed in album liner notes:

- Jean-Michel Jarre – keyboards
- The Amoco Renegades – steel drums
- Guy Delacroix – bass
- Christophe Deschamps – drums
- Michel Geiss – keyboards
- Dominique Perrier – keyboards

== Charts ==
Chart (1990)	Peak position
Austrian Albums (Ö3 Austria)	19
Finnish Albums (Suomen virallinen lista)	11
German Albums (Offizielle Top 100)	27
Spanish Albums (AFYVE)	37
Swedish Albums (Sverigetopplistan)	22
Swiss Albums (Schweizer Hitparade)	21
Dutch Albums (Album Top 100)	27
Norwegian Albums (VG-lista)	11
UK Albums (Official Charts)	14

== Certifications and sales ==
Region	Certification	Certified units/sales
France (SNEP)	2× Gold	550,000
Spain (Promusicae)	Gold	50,000^{^}
Summaries
Worldwide		1,550,000
^{^} Shipments figures based on certification alone.
