= Electronica 1: The Time Machine =

Studio album by Jean-Michel Jarre
- Released: 16 October 2015
- Recorded: 2011–2015
- Genre: Electronic; trip hop; dance
- Length: 68:20
- Label: Columbia
- Producer: Jean-Michel Jarre

Jean-Michel Jarre chronology
Essentials & Rarities (2011)	Electronica 1: The Time Machine (2015)	Electronica 2: The Heart of Noise (2016)

Singles from Electronica 1: The Time Machine
- 1. "Glory" Released: 15 May 2015; 2. "Conquistador" Released: 10 July 2015; 3. "Zero Gravity" Released: 10 July 2015; 4. "Watching You" Released: 10 July 2015; 5. "Stardust" Released: 31 July 2015; 6. "If..!" Released: 28 August 2015

Professional ratings
Aggregate scores
Source	Rating
Metacritic	63/100
Review scores
Source	Rating
Evening Standard	4/5 stars
The Guardian	4/5 stars
The Irish Times	3/5 stars
Louder Than War	8.5/10
Mojo	4/5 stars
The Music	3.5/5 stars
Pitchfork	4.0/10
Uncut	6/10
Under the Radar	4/10

Electronica 1: The Time Machine is the seventeenth studio album by the French electronic musician and composer Jean-Michel Jarre, released on 16 October 2015 by Columbia Records. It was recorded with the help of 15 collaborators, including Moby, Vince Clarke (of Erasure), Gesaffelstein, M83, Armin van Buuren, John Carpenter, Robert "3D" Del Naja of Massive Attack fame, Pete Townshend (from the Who), and the late Edgar Froese of Tangerine Dream, the collaboration being one of Froese's last projects before his death in January 2015.

Jarre announced on 20 April 2015 "Conquistador" as result of his collaboration with French techno producer Gesaffelstein. On 15 May 2015, a second collaboration, this time with French electronic band M83 titled "Glory" was announced, with a music video for the track being released on 23 June 2015. A third collaboration, this time with German electronic band Tangerine Dream was announced on 22 June 2015.

On 28 August 2015, details of the album and the title Electronica 1: The Time Machine were announced, together with the Little Boots track "If..!". The album was nominated for the 59th Annual Grammy Awards in the "Best Dance/Electronic Album" category.

== Background ==
In an interview with Billboard, Jarre said of the album: "I've wanted to tell a story for a while regarding electronic music history and its legacy from my point of view and experience, from when I started to nowadays. I planned to compose for and collaborate with an array of artists, who are, directly or indirectly linked to this scene, with people I admire for their singular contribution to our genre, that represent a source of inspiration for me over the last four decades I have been making music, but who also have an instantly recognizable sound. At the outset, I had no idea how this project would evolve, but I was delighted that everybody I reached out to accepted my invitation." The "E-project" started in 2011 with his unreleased collaboration with David Lynch.

== Track listing ==
No.	Title	Writer(s)	Length
1.	"The Time Machine" (with Boys Noize)	Jarre; Alexander Ridha	3:54
2.	"Glory" (with M83)	Jarre; Anthony Gonzalez	4:12
3.	"Close Your Eyes" (with Air)	Jarre; Nicolas Godin; Jean-Benoit Dunckel	6:15
4.	"Automatic (Part 1)" (with Vince Clarke)	Jarre; Vince Clarke	3:06
5.	"Automatic (Part 2)" (with Vince Clarke)	Jarre; Vince Clarke	3:03
6.	"If..!" (with Little Boots)	Jarre; Victoria Hesketh	3:13
7.	"Immortals" (with Fuck Buttons)	Jarre; Benjamin Power; Andrew Hung	4:24
8.	"Suns Have Gone" (with Moby)	Jarre; Richard Melville Hall	5:55
9.	"Conquistador" (with Gesaffelstein)	Jarre; Mike Lévy	3:09
10.	"Travelator (Part 2)" (with Pete Townshend)	Jarre; Pete Townshend	3:10
11.	"Zero Gravity" (with Tangerine Dream)	Jarre; Edgar Froese	7:12
12.	"Rely on Me" (with Laurie Anderson)	Jarre; Laurie Anderson	2:54
13.	"Stardust" (with Armin van Buuren)	Jarre; Armin Van Buuren	4:37
14.	"Watching You" (with 3D of Massive Attack)	Jarre; Robert Del Naja; Euan Dickinson	4:09
15.	"A Question of Blood" (with John Carpenter)	Jarre; John Carpenter	2:58
16.	"The Train & The River" (with Lang Lang)	Jarre	7:13
Total length:			68:20

Bonus tracks
No.	Title	Length
17.	"Continuous Mix" (not available in the U.S.)	70:27
18.	"Glory" (with M83) (video)	3:07
19.	"If..!" (with Little Boots) (video)	2:59

== Charts and certifications ==
=== Weekly charts ===
Chart performance for Electronica 1: The Time Machine
Chart (2015)	Peak position
Austrian Albums (Ö3 Austria)	12
Belgian Albums (Ultratop Flanders)	9
Belgian Albums (Ultratop Wallonia)	2
Dutch Albums (Album Top 100)	5
Finnish Albums (Suomen virallinen lista)	30
French Albums (SNEP)	3
German Albums (Offizielle Top 100)	4
Irish Albums (IRMA)	19
Italian Albums (FIMI)	24
New Zealand Albums (RMNZ)	37
Norwegian Albums (VG-lista)	14
Polish Albums (ZPAV)	3
Portuguese Albums (AFP)	25
Scottish Albums (OCC)	5
Spanish Albums (PROMUSICAE)	10
Swedish Albums (Sverigetopplistan)	20
Swiss Albums (Schweizer Hitparade)	2
Swiss Albums (Romandy) (Les charts de la Suisse Romande)	1
UK Albums (OCC)	8
UK Dance Albums (OCC)	1
UK Album Downloads (OCC)	9

=== Certifications ===
Region	Certification	Certified units/sales
Poland (ZPAV)	Platinum	20,000^{‡}
^{‡} Sales+streaming figures based on certification alone.
