= Métamorphoses (album) =

Studio album by Jean-Michel Jarre
- Released: 31 January 2000
- Length: 60:09
- Labels: Sony Music; Epic; Disques Dreyfus
- Producers: Jean Michel Jarre; Joachim Garraud

Jean-Michel Jarre chronology
Odyssey Through O_{2} (1998)	Métamorphoses (2000)	Interior Music (2001)

Professional ratings
Review scores
Source	Rating
AllMusic	4/5 stars
Release Magazine	5/10 stars

Métamorphoses is the thirteenth studio album by the French electronic musician and composer Jean-Michel Jarre, released by Sony Music in 1999, Epic Records on 24 January 2000 and by Disques Dreyfus on 25 May 2004 in the United States. The album was followed by two singles: "C'est la Vie" and "Tout Est Bleu".

== Critical reception ==
In Release Magazine, Niklas Forsberg wrote that "it is a musical flashback to a more enthusiastic and innovative Jean Michel Jarre" and added that "Jarre does it better when he's not influenced by anyone but himself." AllMusic writer, Thom Jurek described the album as "the most adventurous recording of Jarre's in a decade, and articulates his universal language of transcultural musicality and futuristic altruism fantastically."

== Track listing ==
All tracks are written by Jean-Michel Jarre.

No.	Title	Length
1.	"Je Me Souviens" (feat. Laurie Anderson)	4:25
2.	"C'est la Vie" (feat. Natacha Atlas)	7:11
3.	"Rendez-vous à Paris" (feat. Sharon Corr)	4:19
4.	"Hey Gagarin"	6:20
5.	"Millions of Stars" (feat. Veronique Bossa and Lisa Jacobs)	5:41
6.	"Tout Est Bleu"	6:01
7.	"Love Love Love"	4:26
8.	"Bells"	3:49
9.	"Miss Moon" (feat. Dierdre Dubois)	6:08
10.	"Give Me a Sign" (feat. Veronique Bossa)	3:49
11.	"Gloria, Lonely Boy"	5:31
12.	"Silhouette" (feat. Ozlem Cetin)	2:29
Total length:		60:09

== Personnel ==
Adapted from album booklet:

- Jean Michel Jarre – vocals, processed vocals, keyboards, synthesizers
- Joachim Garraud – drum programming, sound design, additional keyboards
- Laurie Anderson – vocals on "Je me souviens"
- Natacha Atlas – vocals on "C'est la vie"
- Sharon Corr – violin on "Rendez-vous à Paris"
- Veronique Bossa – vocals on "Give Me a Sign" and "Millions of Stars"
- Dierdre Dubois – vocals on "Miss Moon"
- Lisa Jacobs – vocals on "Millions of Stars"
- Özlem Çetin – vocals on "Silhouette"
- Olivier Constantin - vocals
- Leslie Jacobs - vocals
- Rabah Khalfa - bendir, darbouka
- Raphael Garraud – additional keyboards
- Christopher Papendieck – additional bass keyboards
- Francis Rimbert – additional keyboards
- John Davis - mastering
- Nuit de Chine - art direction, graphic design
- Patrick Pelamourgues - technical assistance
- Jean Baptise Saudray - choir conductor
- Yvan Cassar - string arrangements

== Charts ==
Chart performance for Métamorphoses
Chart (2000)	Peak position
Austrian Albums (Ö3 Austria)	28
Belgian Albums (Ultratop Flanders)	49
Belgian Albums (Ultratop Wallonia)	26
Dutch Albums (Album Top 100)	42
Finnish Albums (Suomen virallinen lista)	7
French Albums (SNEP)	7
German Albums (Offizielle Top 100)	17
Norwegian Albums (VG-lista)	19
Scottish Albums (Official Charts)	77
Spanish Albums (AFYVE)	20
Swedish Albums (Sverigetopplistan)	30
Swiss Albums (Schweizer Hitparade)	32
UK Albums (Official Charts)	37
