= Michel Geiss =

French musician

Michel Geiss is a French sound engineer, instrument designer, and musician who was a long-time collaborator of Jean-Michel Jarre. He has also collaborated with other famous French artists such as Marc Lavoine, Patrick Bruel or Laurent Voulzy. In 1978, during the recording of Equinoxe he designed the Matrisequencer 250, an instrument that later was used in Rendez-Vous (1986). The instrument was succeeded by the Geiss Digisequencer.
