= Equinoxe =

Studio album by Jean-Michel Jarre
- Released: 1 December 1978
- Recorded: January–August 1978
- Studios: Jean-Michel Jarre's home studio, Paris
- Genres: Electronic; ambient; space music; new-age
- Length: 39:02
- Label: Disques Dreyfus
- Producer: Jean Michel Jarre

Jean-Michel Jarre chronology
Oxygène (1976)	Equinoxe (1978)	Les Chants Magnétiques (1981)

Singles from Equinoxe
- 1. "Equinoxe Part 5" Released: 29 December 1978; 2. "Equinoxe Part 4" Released: June 1979

Equinoxe (French pronunciation: [ekinɔks], English: Equinox) is the fourth studio album by French electronic musician and composer Jean-Michel Jarre, released on 1 December 1978 on the Dreyfus record label, licensed to Polydor Records for its worldwide distribution in 1979. The album featured two singles: "Equinoxe Part 4" and "Equinoxe Part 5", the latter having more success reaching No. 45 on the UK Singles Chart. It reached number 11 on the UK Album Chart and number 126 on the US Billboard 200 chart.

== Composition and recording ==
The album was recorded from January to August 1978 in the makeshift recording studio set up in Jarre's apartment in Paris. The making of the album was done with a 16-track MCI tape. Jarre stated that although his previous album Oxygène was created without a concept in mind, Equinoxe was intended to represent a day in the life of a person, from waking up in the morning to sleeping at night.

The aquatic, rain, storm and thunder sounds that play on various tracks were designed by French sound engineer Michel Geiss. Apart from using the ARP 2600, Jarre also used liberal echo whips in the various sound effects generated by the EMS VCS 3 synthesizer. Both the Eminent 310 Unique organ and the VCS 3 went through an Electro-Harmonix Small Stone guitar phasing pedal in order to provide the string pads used on the album. The main sound of "Equinoxe Part 1" was created using Eminent's SUST string configuration. The album also used the Korg Mini Pops drum machine.

Jarre's musical ideas were initially recorded on a small cassette recorder, "as an audio scratch pad". Jarre considered discarding one of the recordings as he did not think that it was good enough, but Geiss convinced him to keep it, and the track later became "Equinoxe Part 7". Jarre also told Geiss that one of his wishes was to get a sequencer based on a matrix. Geiss designed the Matrisequencer 250, an 2x50 note instrument which "became one of the main instruments in Equinoxe." The Rhythmicomputer designed by Geiss also was used. The album was mixed at Gang Studio by Jean-Pierre Janiaud with assistance from Patrick Foulon.

== Artwork ==
As with Oxygène, the cover art for Equinoxe used a painting by Michel Granger, in this case, Le trac (English: Stage Fright). Granger visited Jarre's private mansion in Croissy to present him with different paintings that would illustrate the album cover. Each of the canvases was projected by light cannons, and Le trac was immediately chosen by Jean-Michel.

== Release and promotion ==
Equinoxe was released in December 1978 by Disques Dreyfus and internationally by Polydor Records, The album was promoted in London, UK. Two singles were released from the album, "Equinoxe Part 4" and "Equinoxe Part 5", the latter having more success reaching No. 45 on the UK Singles Chart and was described as a "synth-pop primer." The release was followed by a laser show and fireworks directed by Disques Dreyfus outside the Palais des Festivals, Cannes where the album was broadcast at high volume on the public address system, and also by a February 1979 promotional tour in the United States.

A concert on the Place de la Concorde, Paris was held on 14 July of that year. The concert attracted over a million people, at the time the largest crowd for an outdoor concert. Although it was not the first time he had performed in concert (Jarre had already played at the Paris Opera Ballet), the 40 minute-long event, which used projections of light, images and fireworks, served as a blueprint for Jarre's future concerts. Its popularity helped create a surge in sales—a further 800,000 records were sold between 14 July and 31 August 1979—and the Frenchman Francis Rimbert featured at the event. Along with its 1976 predecessor, both sold more than 1.5 million copies in France and in 1981, it would be certified platinum, in November 1979, both sold 11 million worldwide.

== Critical reception ==
Professional ratings
Review scores
Source	Rating
AllMusic	3/5 stars
Mojo	4/5 stars
Record Mirror	2/5 stars

Contemporary critical reception for the album in the UK was negative. Davitt Sigerson of Melody Maker said "it is as slushily, pseudo-galactically crass and vapid as last year's Oxygène. The melodies are trite, harmonies predictable, textures almost determinedly hackneyed (even down to artificial 'weather' effects to generate mood). There isn't even much that's danceable." In Record Mirror, Steve Gett called the album "very artificial, and as a result quite emotionless." He continued saying that, "as far as [he] was concerned the effect was one of sleep inducement, basically because it seems so lifeless and infinite, never reaching a specific goal but merely drifting on."

In the US, Cashbox wrote that "the result is a complex, starkly-toned album which is surprisingly accessible and invigorating. Although even liberal AOR stations may hesitate to place this LP on steady rotating, Jarre's sizable following plus adventurous rock fans will find this LP fascinating." The Pittsburgh Press described the album as "a moody, melodic, masterful synthesizer symphony" and "a dazzling musical poem, a pleasure to listen to, a delight to experience." In The Bulletin, William D. Loffler commented that the "titles are meaningless because the music is something like a stretched-out electronic tone poem." Retrospective reviews of the album have been more favourable. Phil Alexander of Mojo listed it as one of Jarre's three key albums, noting the influence of abstract art and classical composers Claude Debussy, Maurice Ravel and Nino Rota on Equinoxe, and wrote that "Jarre attempted to trace the human experience from morning to night across eight tracks on an album that is sensual and, in places, deeply melancholic."

Mike DeGagne of AllMusic commented in his review [emphasis added]:

As the follow-up album to Oxygene, Equinoxe offers the same mesmerizing effect, with rapid spinning sequencer washes and bubbling synthesizer portions all lilting back and forth to stardust scatterings of electronic pastiches. Using more than 13 different types of synthesizers, Jarre combines whirling soundscapes of multi-textured effects, passages, and sometimes suites to culminate interesting electronic atmospheres. [...] So much electronic color is added to every track that it is impossible to concentrate on any particular segment, resulting in waves of synth drowning the ears at high tide.

== Legacy ==
"Equinoxe Part 1", and "Equinoxe Part 2" were used in the Mexican telenovela "Los Ricos También Lloran" starring Verónica Castro, and Rogelio Guerra.

A segment of "Equinoxe Part 1" was used in the final ident of Programme One.

”Equinoxe Part 4” provided the title music for Television New Zealand’s “Our World” nature documentary series which ran on the state broadcaster from 1984 to 1991.

"Equinoxe Part 1", "Equinoxe Part 3" and "Equinoxe Part 4" were used in Cosmos: A Personal Voyage by Carl Sagan, however they were not included on the series' soundtrack albums. In the 1984 computer game for Commodore 64, Loco, a remake of "Equinoxe Part 5" and "Equinoxe Part 6" by Ben Daglish was used. In 2018, four decades after the album's release, Jarre produced a sequel, titled Equinoxe Infinity.

== Track listing ==
All tracks are composed by Jean-Michel Jarre.

Side one

1. "Equinoxe Part 1" – 2:23
2. "Equinoxe Part 2" – 5:01
3. "Equinoxe Part 3" – 5:11
4. "Equinoxe Part 4" – 6:52

Side two

1. "Equinoxe Part 5" – 3:54
2. "Equinoxe Part 6" – 3:15
3. "Equinoxe Part 7" – 7:24
4. "Equinoxe Part 8" – 5:02

== Personnel ==
Personnel listed in album liner notes:

- Jean-Michel Jarre – production
- Jean-Pierre Janiaud – mixing engineer
- Patrick Foulon – mixing assistant
- Michel Granger – artwork
- Charlotte Rampling-Jarre – back photography

== Equipment ==
Adapted from the liner notes of the 2014 remastered version.

- ARP 2600
- EMS VCS 3
- EMS Synthi AKS
- Yamaha CS-60
- Oberheim Polyphonic Synthesizer
- RMI Harmonic Synthesizer
- ELKA 707
- Korg Polyphonic Ensemble
- Eminent 310 Unique
- Mellotron
- ARP Sequencer
- Oberheim Digital Sequencer
- Geiss Matrisequencer 250
- Geiss Rhythmi-computer
- Korg KR 55
- EMS Vocoder 1000

== Charts ==
=== Weekly charts ===
Chart (1978–1979)	Peak position
Australian Albums (Kent Music Report)	48
Austrian Albums (Ö3 Austria)	14
French Albums (SNEP)	5
Dutch Albums (Album Top 100)	3
German Albums (Offizielle Top 100)	22
New Zealand Albums (RMNZ)	36
UK Albums (Official Charts)	11
US Billboard 200	126

=== Year-end charts ===
Chart (1979)	Rank
Dutch Albums (MegaCharts)	20
German Albums (Offizielle Top 100)	30
UK Albums (BMRB)	55

== Certifications and sales ==
Region	Certification	Certified units/sales
Canada (Music Canada)	Gold	50,000^{^}
France (SNEP)	Platinum	1,500,000
Germany (BVMI)	Gold	250,000^{^}
Japan	—	35,000
Netherlands (NVPI)	Gold	75,000
Sweden	—	15,000
United Kingdom (BPI)	Gold	100,000^{^}
Summaries
Worldwide	—	3,000,000
^{^} Shipments figures based on certification alone.
