= EMS Synthi AKS =

Synthesizer model

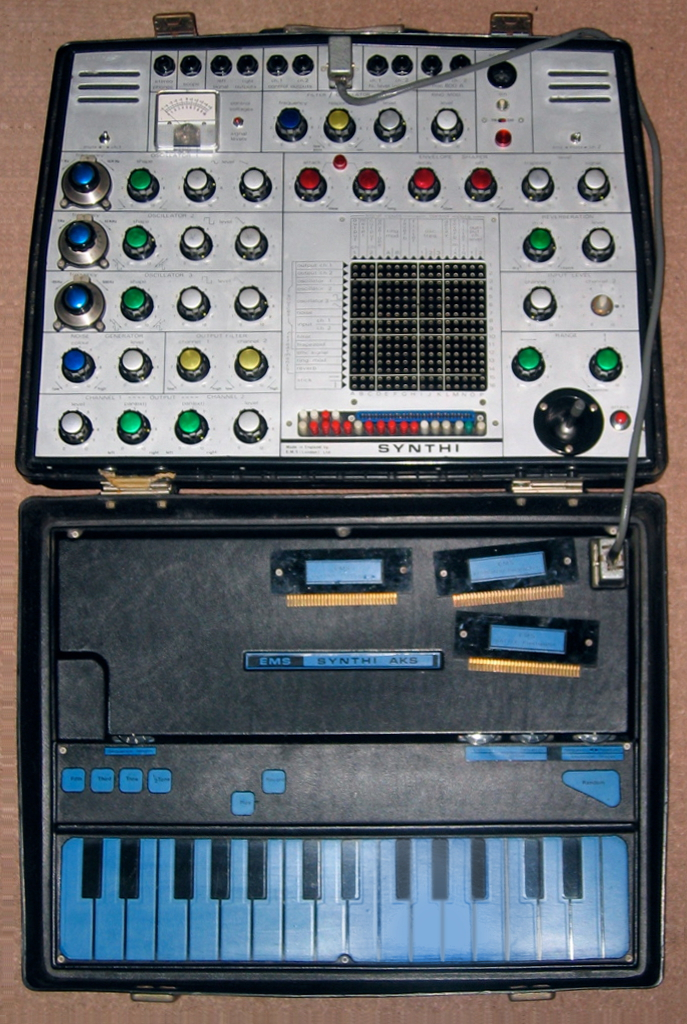

The EMS Synthi A and the EMS Synthi AKS are portable modular analog synthesisers made by EMS of England. The Synthi A model debuted in May 1971, and then Synthi AKS model appeared in March 1972 a with a built-in keyboard and sequencer. The EMS Synthi models are notable for its patch pin matrix, its functions and internal design are similar to the VCS 3 synthesiser, also made by EMS. EMS is still run by Robin Wood in Cornwall, and in addition to continuing to build and sell new units, the company repairs and refurbishes EMS equipment.

When launched in 1972, the Synthi AKS retailed for around £450. An optional three octave (37 note) monophonic keyboard, the DK1 Dynamic Keyboard, was made available for it. Later on, the DK2 (Dynamic Keyboard 2) was released, allowing independent control of two oscillators, and thus enabling the player to play two notes together. The Synthi instruments were used widely in progressive rock and electronic music.

As with the VCS3, a Synthi AKS was worth considerably more than its original price by the late 1970s. In 2020, the average price for a Synthi AKS in good condition was around US$20,000 on the international market.

== Use ==
The Synthi AKS was used by David Gilmour of Pink Floyd on The Dark Side of the Moon, most prominently on the song "On the Run". The repeating eight-note sequence that forms the basis of the song was created using the Synthi AKS' sequencer.

The Synthi AKS has been used extensively by Brian Eno in his art rock and ambient albums. He particularly made prominent use of its signal-chain editing capability in order to add colour to his own voice as well as Robert Fripp and Phil Manzanera's guitar work. His early band, Roxy Music, supposedly requested that he join them after watching him tinker with the Synthi AKS for only a few minutes.

In 1987, while in the studio to record their album Music for the Masses, one of the synthesizers used by Depeche Mode included an EMS Synthi AKS, which band member and producer Alan Wilder described as "really old, and it comes in a briefcase, like a businessman's case. It looks amazing, really James Bond. It's a noise machine, really."

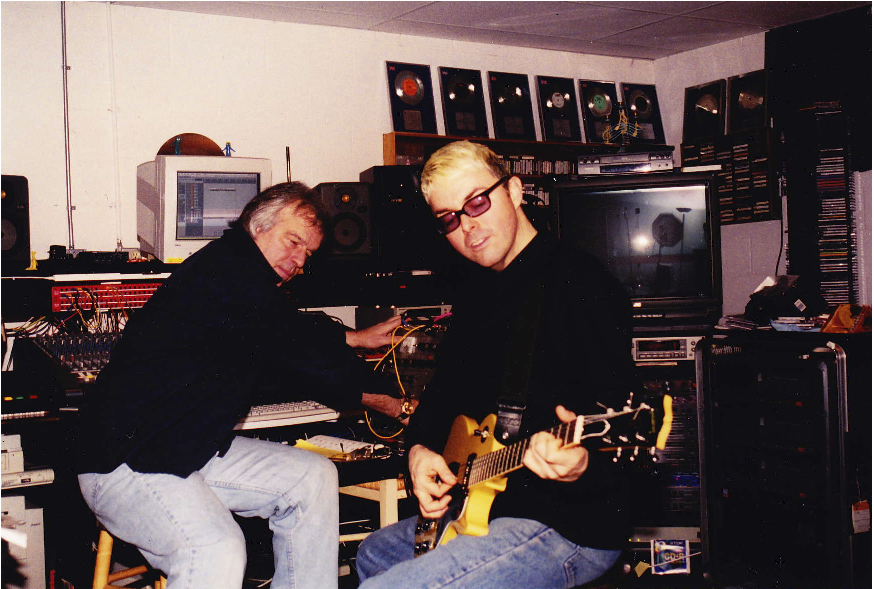
Producer Tony Visconti and artist Richard Barone in the studio with the EMS Synthi AKS

In 2013, a Japanese artist Yoshio Machida made an album "Music from the SYNTHI". This album was made by only Synthi AKS.

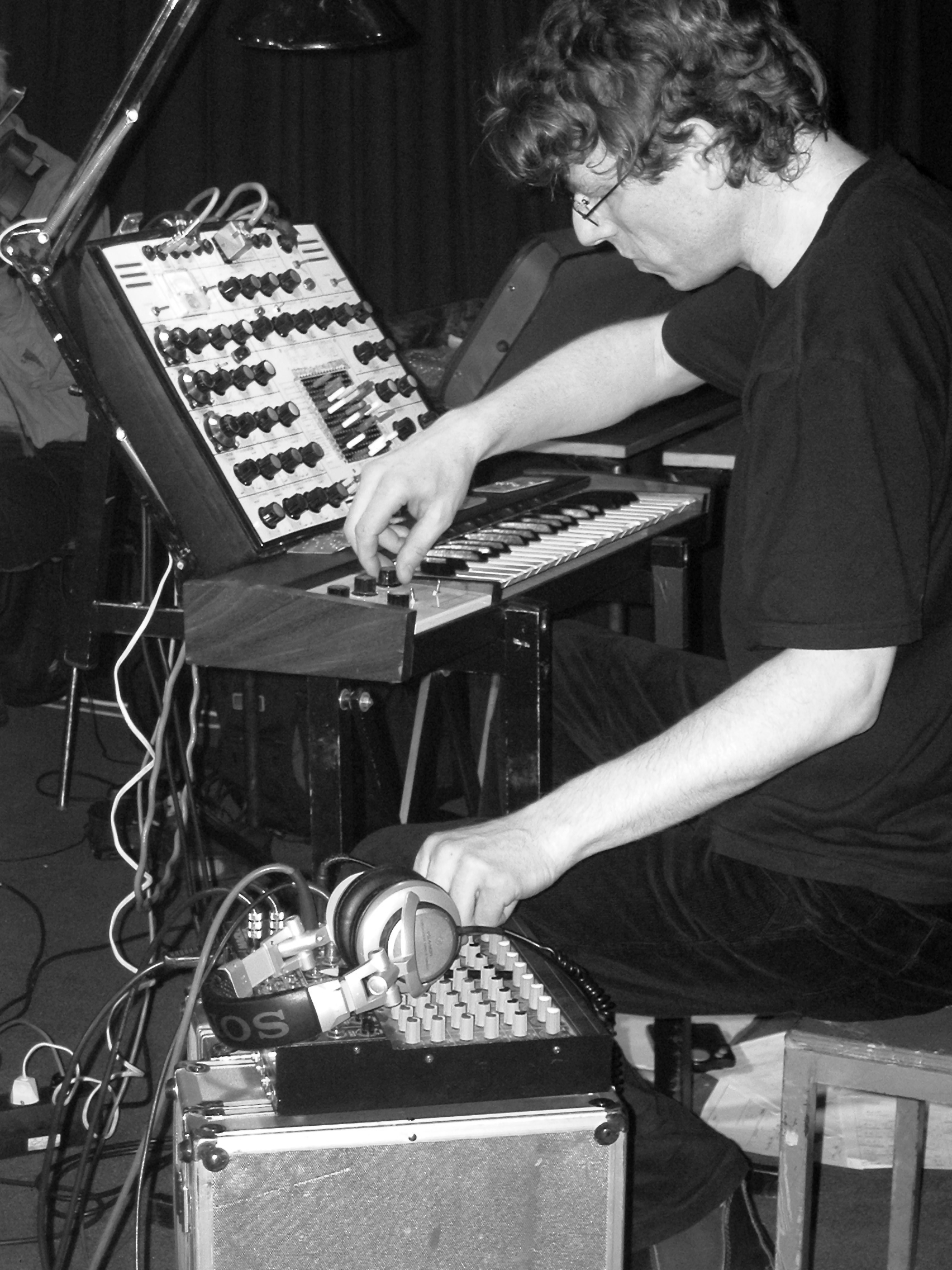
Thomas Lehn playing Synthi A & DK keyboard
