= Paris La Défense – Une Ville En Concert =

1990 concert by Jean-Michel Jarre

Paris La Défense advertising

Paris La Défense – Une Ville En Concert was a concert held by musician Jean-Michel Jarre on the district of La Défense in Paris on Bastille Day, 14 July 1990. About 2.5 million people standing in front of the pyramidal stage all the way down to the Arc de Triomphe witnessed this event, setting a new Guinness Book of Records entry for Jarre. The concert was funded by the Mairie de Paris, the Ministry of Culture and a small cluster of high-profile Parisian business concerns. Later, a concert video as well as a photobook of the event were released.

The show featured new tracks from the Waiting for Cousteau album. The concert is the only time that the track Calypso 2 has been performed live to date. Vast grotesque marionettes created by Trinidadian Peter Minshall were used in the concert, along with a live steel drum band.

A 50 minute television edit was produced for broadcast worldwide after the event and a 75 minute edit later released on VHS cassette in 1992. The tracks "Equinoxe Part V" and "Rendez-Vous 4" were not included on the VHS release for unknown reasons, while encore of "Calypso 1" was played over a video montage for the end credits. Only camcorder footage exists of these tracks, available on YouTube. A DVD release of the VHS edit was mooted by Jarre for a number of years but was eventually dropped.

An unofficial, broadcast quality, double CD of the entire concert exists and has been traded amongst fans since the event.

== Track listing ==
- "Waiting For Cousteau" (played on loop before the concert)
- "Paris La Défense"
- "Oxygène (Part 4)"
- "Equinoxe Part IV"
- "Equinoxe Part V"(*)
- "Souvenir de Chine" ("Souvenir of China")
- "Les Chants Magnétiques II" ("Magnetic Fields II")
- "Ethnicolor"
- "Ethnitransition"
- "Zoolookologie"
- "Revolution, Revolutions"
- "Second Rendez-Vous"
- "Calypso 2"
- "Calypso 3" – Fin De Siècle
- "Calypso"
- "Fourth Rendez-Vous"(*)
- "Calypso" (encore)

Songs marked (*) are omitted from the official video release.

== Musicians ==
- Jean-Michel Jarre: synthesizers
- Michel Geiss: synthesizers
- Francis Rimbert: synthesizers
- Dominique Perrier: synthesizers
- Frederick Rousseau: synthesizers
- Sylvain Durand: synthesizers
- Guy Delacroix: bass, synthesizers
- Christophe Deschamps: Drums and percussion
- Dino Lumbroso: drums and percussion
- Christine Durand: soprano
- Larbi Ouechni: Arab vocals
- Amoco Renegades (directed by Jit Samaroo): steel drums
- Maîtrise des Hauts-de-Seine (conducted by Bruno Rossignol): choir
- Al Mawsili: classical Arab orchestra

== Instruments used ==
- ARP 2500
- ARP 2600
- Elka AMK8
- Elka Synthex
- Elka MK-88
- EMS AKS
- EMS VCS3
- Korg EXM1R
- Korg T3
- Roland D-50
- Roland D-550
- Roland D-70
- Roland MKS-80 (Super Jupiter)
- Akai S1000
- Roland S-550
- Yamaha KX-5
- Clavier Circulaire
- Laser Harp
- LAG Mad Max II
- LAG Insecte
- ARP Sequencer
- Alesis Quadraverb
- Alesis 1622
- MIDI Tap Lone Wolf
- Atari Mega ST 4 (11 units)
- C-Lab Unitor
- Pearl Drums
- Pad Pearl
- Musicman Stingray 5 Bass
