= LAG Insecte =

MIDI controller

- Manufacturer: LAG
- Dates: 1988

Technical specifications

Input/output

The LAG Insecte is a portable keyboard which allows an artist to move around on stage while playing stationary electronic instruments. It was specially made in France for Jean-Michel Jarre in 1988 by LAG. Jarre used the keyboard in 1988 at the Docklands concert and in 1990 at La Défense concert. He also used it for the Industrial Revolution (overture) on the album Revolutions.

The Insescte is a 29-key MIDI controller, that is not capable of producing its own sounds. Instead it triggers up to 16 other instruments via standardized communication, known as MIDI. It contains an internal Z80 microprocessor and pitch bend (a control that lets the musician bend a note's pitch).

== Design ==
The Insecte had a science-fiction design; it was meant to resemble an insect. The design was said to be inspired by the film Blade Runner, and drawings of Enki Bilal.

== Microphone ==
A homemade Shure microphone used for the vocoder effect on the Jean-Michel Jarre track Revolution.

== Construction ==
The white keys were constructed from wood and the black keys were constructed of sheathed leather. The case was also made of wood. The controllers and buttons were made of iron and aged plastic.

== Concerts used in ==
- Destination Docklands
- Paris la Defense
