= Dulcie September =

South African anti-apartheid activist (1935–1988)

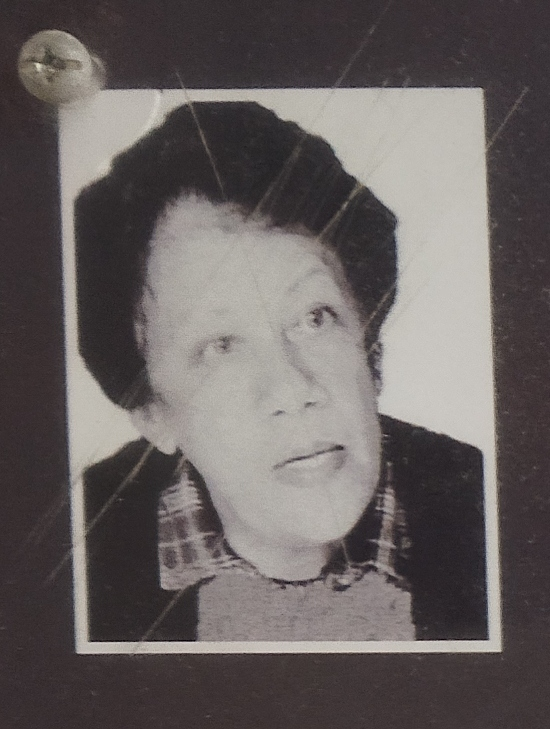
- Born: Dulcie Evonne September; 20 August 1935; South Africa
- Died: 29 March 1988 (aged 52); Paris, France
- Cause of death: Assassination by firearm
- Occupation(s): Teacher, political activist
- Years active: 1956–1988
- Organization: African National Congress
- Known for: Anti-apartheid activism

Dulcie Evonne September (20 August 1935 – 29 March 1988) was a South African anti-apartheid political activist who was assassinated in Paris, France, in 1988.

== Early life ==
The second eldest daughter of Jakobus and Susan September, September grew up in Gleemore, a suburb of Cape Town. While living in Cape Town, September cultivated her social awareness concerning the state of apartheid and dedicated herself to political activism, fighting for national liberation, democracy, and social justice. She began her primary schooling at Klipfontein Methodist Mission, and later attended Athlone High School. As a “Cape Coloured,” she witnessed first hand the segregation built into the South African school system based on Bantu education laws, forming the crux of her political framework. Several of her teachers at Athlone High School were actively involved in civic and political organizations and helped raise September's political consciousness and social awareness. Though her formal schooling was cut short halfway through Standard Eight (Grade 10), September continued her education by attending night classes. She passed her Standard Eight exams in 1952. In 1954, she enrolled at the Wesley Training School in Salt River to pursue a career in teaching, and completed her Teacher's Diploma in 1955 at Battswood Training College.

She began her teaching career, first at City Mission School in Maitland, then at Bridgetown East Primary School in Athlone in 1956, and in 1957 became a member of the newly established Cape Peninsula Students' Union (CPSU), affiliate of the Unity Movement of South Africa, which aimed at overcoming racial divisions and forging solidarity among students of different cultural backgrounds. Through CPSU, September met other political activists such as Dr. Kenneth Abrahams, Ottilie Abrahams, Neville Alexander, Marcus Solomon, and Fikile Bam, who would later become her political allies. She belonged to the Athlone branch of the Teacher's League of South Africa (TLSA).

== Activism in South Africa ==
After facing frustration with TLSA and forgoing her membership, September subsequently joined the African Peoples' Democratic Union of Southern Africa (APDUSA), established in 1960. She was later elected to the APDUSA’s finance committee, though the APDUSA was soon divided into two divisions due to internal conflict. Under the leadership of Dr. Kenneth Abrahams and Neville Alexander, who were both suspended from APDUSA in 1962, September and others formed an unofficial body within the APDUSA, the Caucus, to reconcile differences within the organization. After the Sharpeville massacre, September and other likeminded activists grew frustrated with the endless political discussions and adopted a militant stance.

Under the direction of Neville Alexander, September and other likeminded militant activists formed the militant study group named the Yu Chi Chan Club (YCCC) in July 1962, inspired by the Chinese Communist Revolution and named after Chinese guerilla warfare. The YCCC was later disbanded at the end of that same year and was replaced with the National Liberation Front (NLF), launched in January 1963. On 12 July 1963, September’s home was raided by security police, followed by Neville Alexander’s home. When NLF materials were found in their homes, September was detained on 7 October 1963 and put into Roeland Street Prison without trial. Together with nine others, she was charged under the Criminal Procedure Act, the principal charge being "conspiracy to commit acts of sabotage, and incite acts of politically motivated violence". After months of court proceedings, judgment was delivered on 15 April 1964.

== Imprisonment and release ==
September was sentenced to five years imprisonment, during which time she endured severe physical and psychological abuse. September, along with her fellow prisoners, Elizabeth van der Heyden, Doris van der Hayden, and Dorothy Alexander, were eventually moved to a facility reserved for political prisoners at Kroonstad after authorities discovered they were radicalizing illiterate female prisoners. In March 1965, the Bloemfontein Appeal Court dismissed NLF members for their request to appeal their sentences. September was released a few years later in April 1969, with a strict five-year banning order under the Pretoria regime. September then went to live with her sister in Paarl.

According to the conditions of her release from prison in April 1969, the Pretoria regime imposed strict restrictions on September under the Suppression of Communism Act of 1950 to be lifted on 30 April 1974. Under Section 9(1), September was prohibited from engaging in social gatherings, political activities, and teaching in South Africa. Under Section 10(1)(a), her activities were further restricted, including the placement of a strict curfew, restriction from “Bantu areas,” prohibition from communicating with other persons restricted by the Act (including many of her friends and political allies), and a ban on receiving almost all visitors (except medical personnel and her father, which was later changed to her sister and brother-in-law).

== International work ==
In 1973, as her banning order drew to a close, September applied for a permanent departure permit, having secured a position at Madeley College of Education in Staffordshire. She left South Africa on 19 December 1973. In London, she joined the activities of the Anti-Apartheid Movement and was in the frontline of numerous political rallies and demonstrations at South Africa House in Trafalgar Square. Later she gave up her job as a teacher and joined the staff of the International Defence and Aid Fund for Southern Africa. In 1976, she joined the African National Congress (ANC) where she worked in the ANC Women's League. It was here where she was recognized for her dedication to women's issues and made it her mission to welcome newly exiled South Africans to London. In 1979, International Year of the Child (IYC), she was elected chairperson of the IYC Committee of the ANC Women's Section in London. As a representative of the ANC, September attended conferences in Finland, Canada, and France and worked with the United Nations (UN), non-governmental organizations (NGOs), and the Women’s’ International Democratic Federation (WIDF) to champion children’s and women’s rights. In 1981, September was called to work full-time in the Regional Preparatory Committee (RPC) at the ANC headquarters in Lusaka, where she was soon elected as chairperson. At the end of 1983, September was appointed ANC Chief Representative in France, Switzerland and Luxembourg. Subsequently, she underwent a required, short military training in the Soviet Union. As Chief Representative, September rallied support and pushed for economic sanctions of the South African government in the three countries directly under her mission.

Between October 1986 and September 1987, September was involved in the Albertini Affair, an anti-apartheid movement that ended with the embarrassment of both the South African and French governments. During this time, she campaigned for the release of Pierre Andre Albertini, a French national who had become involved with the ANC and was subsequently imprisoned by the South African government. Additionally, she petitioned for the French president, Francois Mitterrand, to deny South Africa's new French ambassador, Hennie Geldenhuys, until Albertini was released from his prison in Ciskei.

By 1987, September had become a formidable threat to the South African government. She raised strong anti-apartheid campaigns in France, Switzerland, and Luxembourg, where she pushed for economic sanctions and disinvestment of South Africa. Additionally, September forged strong ties with anti-apartheid pressure groups and left-wing politicians in these countries.

== Assassination ==
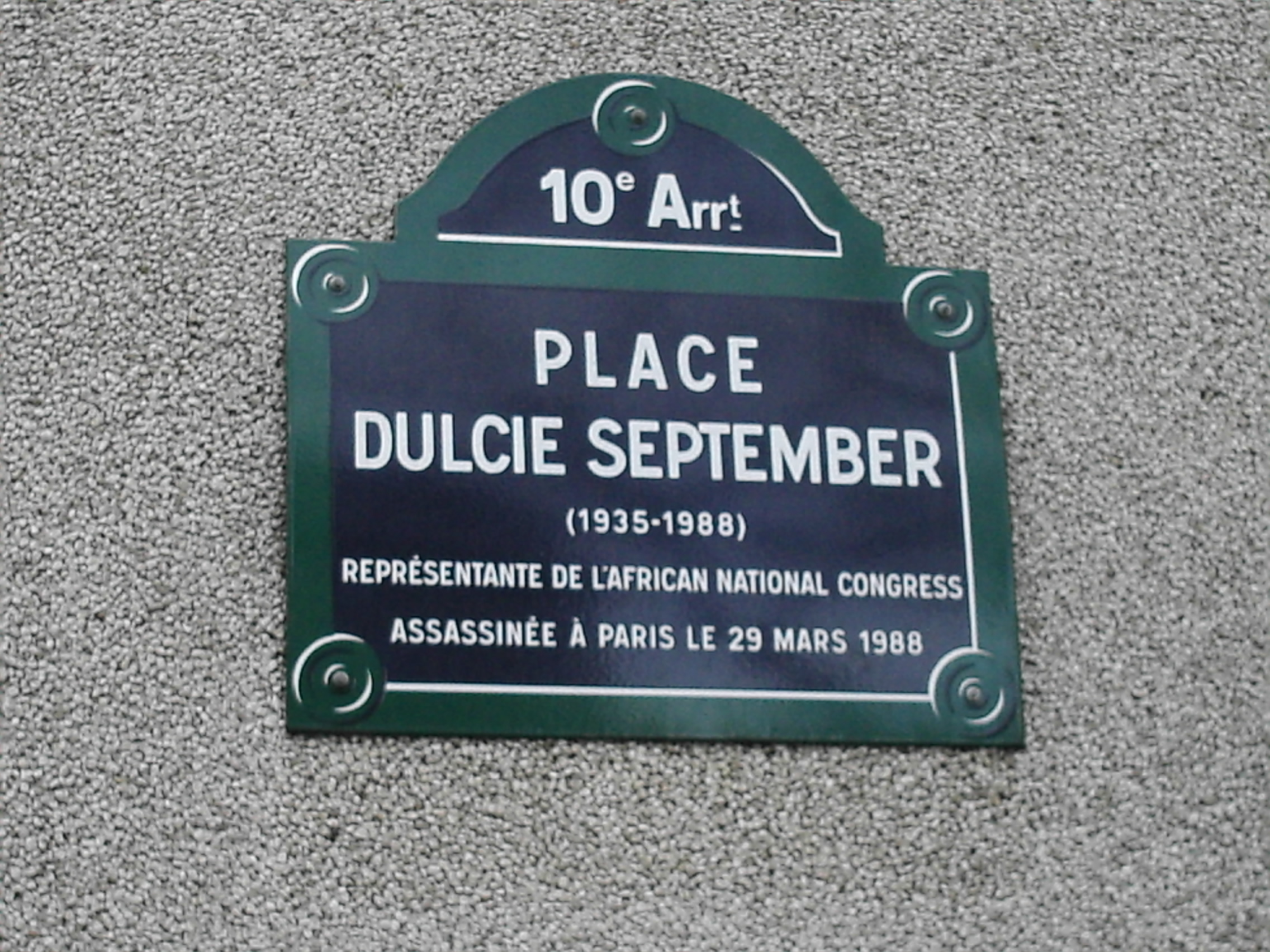
Memorial plaque for September

On the morning of 29 March 1988, September was shot 5 times with a silenced .22 caliber rifle outside the ANC's Paris office at 28, Rue des Petites-Écuries, as she was opening the office after collecting the mail. She was 52 years old. Her death stoked a strong popular reaction in Paris where more than 20,000 gathered to mourn.

Her case remains unsolved. There is speculation that her assassination was the work of South African hitmen, possibly with the collaboration of the French secret service. The French government concluded that there was no sufficient evidence to take any suspects into custody, and the case was closed after remaining unsolved for 10 years.

Before her assassination, September had been investigating trafficking of weapons between France and South Africa. In an investigation held by the Truth Commission Files, it was found that the crime motive was possibly linked to September’s knowledge of the illegal arms dealings as well as a possible nuclear collaboration between the French government and the South African Armscor. Upon her discovery of this knowledge, September allegedly said she “feared for her life.” During her investigation into the illegal dealings between France and South Africa, she reported her concerns to some of her superiors in the ANC, where she was promptly dismissed. Some of September’s friends allege that before her death, September reported being followed and threatened and asked for protection from French authorities, to which she was denied. Charles Pasqua, the interior minister, denied these allegations and claimed that September never made such request. However, sources claim that the French had intelligence that South Africa had plans to possible kill September by December 1987, though this is officially denied.

On the day after her murder, Alfred Nzo, secretary-general of the African National Congress, commented: "If ever there was a soft target, Dulcie September was one."

== Legacy ==
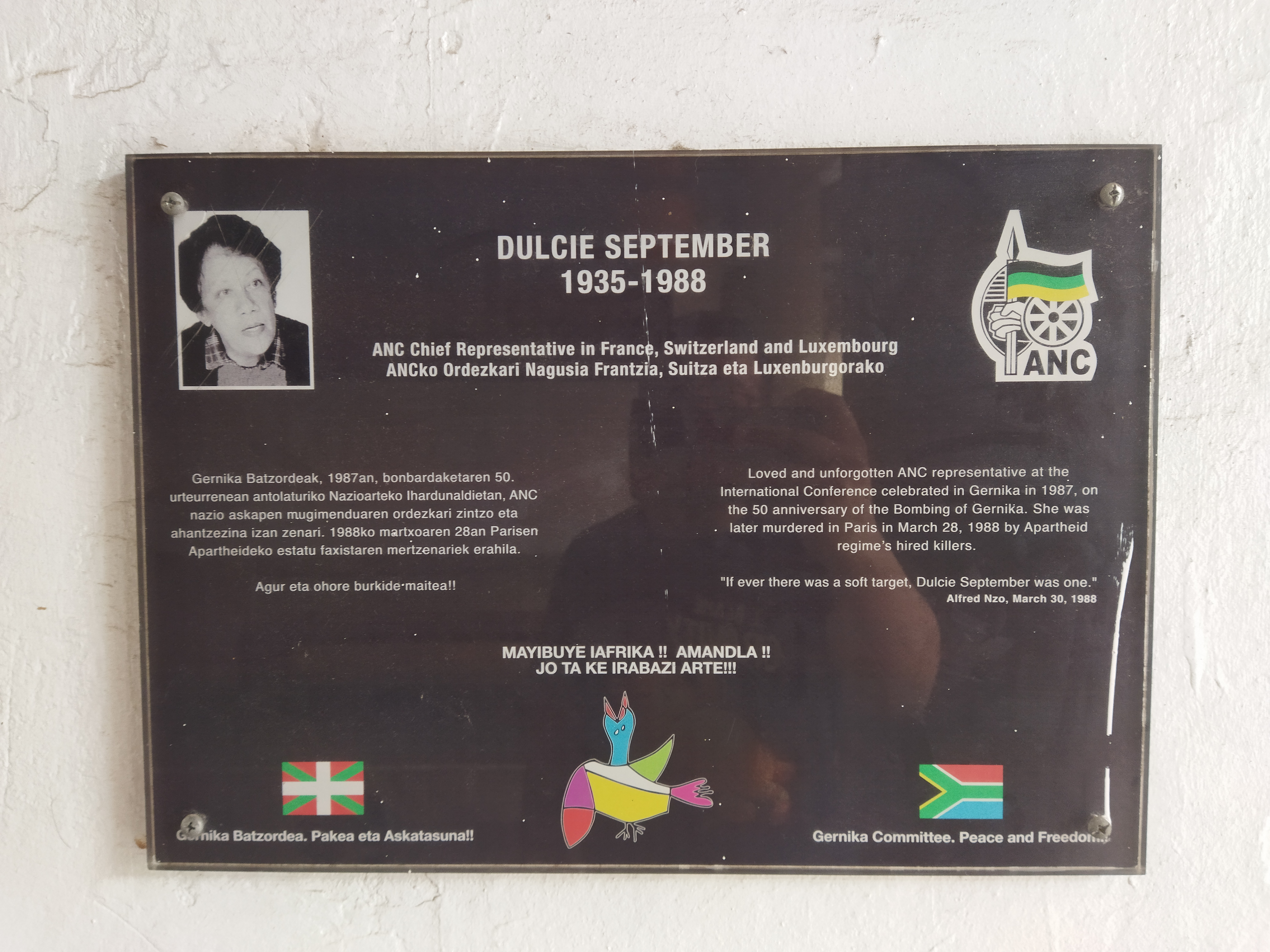
Memorial to September in the Basque town of Guernica

=== Arts and media ===
Jean-Michel Jarre composed a song for his 1988 Revolutions album named "September", dedicated to Dulcie September. The song was performed at his Destination Docklands concert at London's Royal Victoria Dock in October 1988, and features on the album recording of this, Jarre Live (1989).

The conceptual artist Hans Haacke devoted his 1989 installation "One Day, The Lions of Dulcie September Will Spout Water in Jubilation" to her. The site-specific intervention that modified an existing but defunct fountain in front of the Grande halle de la Villette in Paris, was part of the exhibition Magiciens de la terre by Jean-Martin Hubert.

Her short story "A Split Society – Fast Sounds on the Horizon" was included in the 1992 anthology Daughters of Africa, edited by Margaret Busby.

Cold Case: Revisiting Dulcie September is a solo play written by Basil Appollis and Sylvia Vollenhoven that pays tribute to Dulcie September, played by Denise Newman. The play was invited to perform at a French cultural festival in Paris and eventually won the inaugural Adelaide Tambo Award for Human Rights in the Arts.

A book about her murder, Dulcie: Een Vrouw Die Haar Mond Moest Houden by Evelyn Groenink, was published in the Netherlands in 2001. A podcast about the murder of Dulcie September, They Killed Dulcie by Open Secrets and Sound Africa, was released in March 2019. The 2021 documentary Murder in Paris (directed by Enver Samuel and edited by Nikki Comninos) explores the life and assassination of September. Subsequently, an online awareness campaign and petition for September was started under the hashtags “#justicefordulcie” and “#mercidulcie.”

The 300-page graphic novel, Dulcie from Cape Town to Paris, an investigation into the murder of an anti-apartheid activist, was published by Benoît Collombat and Grégory Mardon to revive the September’s murder investigation 30 years after her assassination.

=== Memorials and dedications ===
A square in the 10th arrondissement of Paris is named after Dulcie September, and was officially inaugurated on 31 March 1998, ten years after her death. Translated from French, the plate reads “Dulcie September Square: Representative of the African National Congress: Assassinated in Paris on 29 March 1988.” A street in Cléon, near Rouen, is named after her. There is also a place named Dulcie September in Nantes, and a primary school in Évry-sur-Seine carries her name as well as a middle school (collège in French) in Arcueil, the town near Paris where she last lived.

In August 2010, the first Dulcie September Memorial Lecture took place at The Centre for Humanities Research of the University of the Western Cape, as well as the launch of the Dulcie September Fellowship Awards in the Humanities and Social Sciences that featured speakers including Barbara Masekela and Margaret Busby.

In October 2011, Staffordshire University Students' Union honoured Dulcie September by renaming their boardroom the "September Room" and erecting a plaque in her memory. She was a former student of Madeley College of Education, one of the founding colleges of North Staffordshire Polytechnic.

In 2013 the Athlone Civic Centre was renamed the Dulcie September Civic Centre.

In Amsterdam, Netherlands, a road in the city's Transvaalbuurt is named Dulcie Septemberpad. Other buildings and streets in the neighbourhood have also been named after prominent historic South Africans, including Steve Bikoplein, Nelson Mandela School and Retiefstraat.

== See also ==
- List of people subject to banning orders under apartheid
