= Jarre Live =

Live album by Jean-Michel Jarre
- Released: 2 October 1989
- Recorded: October 8 & 9, 1988, Royal Victoria Docks, London Docklands via Fleetwood Mobile
- Genre: Electronica, world music, synthpop, electro
- Length: 54:00
- Label: Disques Dreyfus
- Producer: Jean-Michel Jarre

Jean-Michel Jarre chronology
Revolutions (1988)	Jarre Live (1989)	Waiting for Cousteau (1990)

Jarre Live, later re-released as Destination Docklands: The London Concert, is a live album by Jean-Michel Jarre, released on 2 October 1989 on Disques Dreyfus. It was recorded during Jarre's Destination Docklands concerts of 1988, which consisted of two concerts in London; this was the first time the docklands district of London and the river Thames became the scene for a concert.

The concerts featured performances of all the tracks from Jarre's recent album Revolutions, alongside performances of tracks from his previous albums. Hank Marvin of the Shadows was a special guest on guitar, performing on the tracks "London Kid" and "Rendez-Vous 4". There were 6 tracks performed at concerts but not included on the album - "Equinoxe 5", "Equinoxe 7", "Rendez-Vous 3", "Souvenir of China", "Ethnicolor" and "Tokyo Kid".

== Track listing ==
1. "Introduction (Révolutions)" – 1:03
2. "Ouverture / Overture (Révolution Industrielle)" – 3:00
3. "Industrial Revolution Part 1-2-3" – 5:45
4. "Magnetic Fields II" – 4:09
5. "Oxygène IV" – 3:46
6. "Computer Week-End" – 5:18
7. "Revolutions" – 3:52
8. "London Kid" – 4:57
9. "Rendez-Vous IV" – 4:16
10. "Rendez-Vous II" – 8:54
11. "September" – 4:45
12. "The Emigrant" – 3:53

Composed, Written, Produced by Jean-Michel Jarre

The LP/Vinyl version excludes "London Kid" and "September" from the track list, but credits them in the liner notes.

== Personnel ==
- Synthesizer, Keyboards: Jean-Michel Jarre
- Bass – Guy Delacroix
- Choir – The Newham Academy Of Music
- Conductor (Choir) – Bruno Rossignol
- Drums – Jo Hammer
- Keyboards – Francis Rimbert
- Percussion – Dino Lumbroso
- Soprano Vocals – Christine Durand
- Synthesizer – Dominique Perrier
- Synthesizer – Michel Geiss

=== Additional personnel ===
- General Manager – Anne Slizewicz, Roger Abriol
- Production Manager (French Team) – Arnaud de La Villesbrunne
- Stage Manager – Olivier Matabon
- Promoter – Rod Gunner
- Mixed By – Denis Vanzetto, Michel Geiss
- Musical Coordinator – Sylvain Durand
- Ethnic Music Advisor – Xavier Bellenger
- Sound Engineer – Denis Vanzetto, Laurent Israel Alexandre, Mick Lanaro
- Executive-Producer – Francis Dreyfus
- Personal Assistant To J.M. Jarre – Fiona de Montaignac
- Technician – Patrick Pelamourgues

== Certifications ==
Region	Certification	Certified units/sales
United Kingdom (BPI)	Silver	60,000^{^}
^{^} Shipments figures based on certification alone.
