= Rendez-Vous (Jean-Michel Jarre album) =

Rendez-vous

Studio album by Jean-Michel Jarre
- Released: 1 April 1986
- Length: 35:03
- Label: Disques Dreyfus
- Producer: Jean-Michel Jarre

Jean-Michel Jarre chronology
| Zoolook (1984) | Rendez-vous (1986) | Revolutions (1988) |

Singles from Rendez-Vous
- 1. "Fourth Rendez-Vous" Released: May 1986

Professional ratings
Review scores
| Source | Rating |
|---|---|
| AllMusic | 3/5 stars |

Rendez-Vous is the eighth studio album by electronic musician and composer Jean-Michel Jarre released on Disques Dreyfus, licensed to Polydor, in 1986. The album art was created by long-time collaborator Michel Granger.

== Composition and recording ==
Rendez-Vous was created over a period of about two months. It features heavy use of the Elka Synthex, notably so on "Second Rendez-Vous", a track Jarre often performs using a laser harp. As with Zoolook, it contains elements from the album Musique pour Supermarché, in this case it is in "Fifth Rendez-Vous". Some of the other musical themes on Rendez-Vous were recycled from various singles Jarre wrote and produced for Gérard Lenorman in the 1970s. Jarre also developed "Fourth Rendez-Vous" from a discarded demo at collaborator Michel Geiss' urging, noting that its success as both a single and live staple did little to dissuade his contempt for the song. "Second Rendez-Vous" was inspired by American musician Wendy Carlos' soundtrack to the film A Clockwork Orange, specifically its fusion of "this mad symphonic energy and music with electronics."

The last track on the album was originally scheduled to include a saxophone part recorded by astronaut Ron McNair on the Space Shuttle Challenger, which would have made it the first piece of music to be recorded in space. However, on January 28, 1986, 73 seconds after lift-off, the shuttle disintegrated and the entire Challenger crew were killed. The track was later dedicated to McNair and the other six astronauts on board Challenger. The saxophone part is played by French jazz reedist Pierre Gossez. The album was recorded and mixed at Croissy studio.

== Release ==
Rendez-Vous was released in 1986, the album reached no. 9 in the UK charts and no. 52 in the US. in that same year. It won the Instrumental album of the year category at the Victoires de la Musique, and was nominated for Grammy Award for Best New Age Album in 1987. On April 5, 1986, Jarre performed the large-scale outdoor concert Rendez-vous Houston in Houston, celebrating the 150th anniversary of the founding of Texas and attracting 1.5 million people, marking its second entry into the Guinness World Records.

Jean-Michel presented another performance on October 5, Rendez-Vous Lyon, marking Pope John Paul II's visit to Jarre's hometown, Lyon. According to Jarre, the Pope complimented "Second Rendez-Vous" when speaking with him, calling it "sacred music." In 1998, British commercial broadcaster ITV used a remixed version of "Fourth Rendez-Vous" (called Rendez-Vous 98) for their television coverage of the 1998 FIFA World Cup in France. British group Apollo 440 were credited alongside Jarre for the remix.

During late 1980s to early 1990s, "Fourth Rendez-Vous" was used as the theme music of the "Inter-school Current Affairs and General Knowledge Quiz Competition" (校際時事及學術常識問答比賽) organised by RTHK in British Hong Kong.

== Track listing ==
Side one
| No. | Title | Length |
|---|---|---|
| 1. | "Premier Rendez-Vous" (First Rendez-Vous) | 2:54 |
| 2. | "Deuxième Rendez-Vous" (Second Rendez-Vous) | 10:55 |
| 3. | "Troisième Rendez-Vous" (Third Rendez-Vous) | 3:30 |

Side two
| No. | Title | Length |
|---|---|---|
| 1. | "Quatrième Rendez-Vous" (Fourth Rendez-Vous) | 3:57 |
| 2. | "Cinquième Rendez-Vous" (Fifth Rendez-Vous) | 7:41 |
| 3. | "Dernier Rendez-Vous (Ron's Piece)" (Last Rendez-Vous) | 6:04 |
| Total length: | | 35:01 |

=== Alternate track listing ===
Some editions of the album had the tracks Second and Fifth Rendez-Vous split up into separate parts, and slightly different timings for Fourth and Last Rendez-Vous (Ron's Piece).

| No. | Title | Length |
|---|---|---|
| 1. | "First Rendez-Vous" | 2:54 |
| 2. | "Second Rendez-Vous (Part 1)" | 2:36 |
| 3. | "Second Rendez-Vous (Part 2)" | 3:17 |
| 4. | "Second Rendez-Vous (Part 3)" | 2:18 |
| 5. | "Second Rendez-Vous (Part 4)" (10:54, not specified on CD) | 2:43 |
| 6. | "Third Rendez-Vous" | 3:30 |
| 7. | "Fourth Rendez-Vous" | 4:03 |
| 8. | "Fifth Rendez-Vous (Part 1)" | 2:59 |
| 9. | "Fifth Rendez-Vous (Part 2)" | 1:13 |
| 10. | "Fifth Rendez-Vous (Part 3)" (7:57, not specified on CD) | 3:45 |
| 11. | "Last Rendez-Vous (Ron's Piece)" | 5:47 |
| Total length: | | 35:05 |

== Personnel ==
The personnel listed in album liner notes:

- Jean-Michel Jarre – Seiko DS-250, Elka Synthex, Moog synthesizer, Roland JX 8P, Fairlight CMI, E-mu Emulator II, Eminent 310U, EMS Synthi AKS, Laser Harp, RMI Harmonic Synthesizer, Oberheim OB-X, Yamaha DX100, Roland TR-808, Linn 9000, Sequential Circuits Prophet-5, Casio CZ 5000, ARP 2600
- Michel Geiss – ARP 2600, Eminent BV, Roland TR-808, Matrisequencer
- Joe Hammer – E-mu Drumulator, percussions on "Second Rendez-Vous"
- Dominique Perrier – Memorymoog on "Second Rendez-Vous"
- The Choir of Radio France, directed by Sylvain Durand – vocals on "Second Rendez-Vous"
- David Jarre – Baby Korg keyboard on "Fifth Rendez-Vous"
- Pierre Gossez – saxophone on "Last Rendez-Vous (Ron's Piece)"

== Charts ==
| Chart (1986) | Peak position |
|---|---|
| Austrian Albums (Ö3 Austria) | 15 |
| Finnish Albums (Suomen virallinen lista) | 6 |
| German Albums (Offizielle Top 100) | 20 |
| Dutch Albums (Album Top 100) | 12 |
| New Zealand Albums (RMNZ) | 26 |
| Swedish Albums (Sverigetopplistan) | 8 |
| Swiss Albums (Schweizer Hitparade) | 24 |
| UK Albums (Official Charts) | 9 |
| US Billboard 200 | 52 |

== Certifications ==
| Region | Certification | Certified units/sales |
|---|---|---|
| Brazil | — | 90,000 |
| France (SNEP) | 2× Platinum | 600,000^{*} |
| United Kingdom (BPI) | Gold | 100,000^{^} |
^{*} Sales figures based on certification alone.^{^} Shipments figures based on certification alone.
