= List of Jean-Michel Jarre concerts =

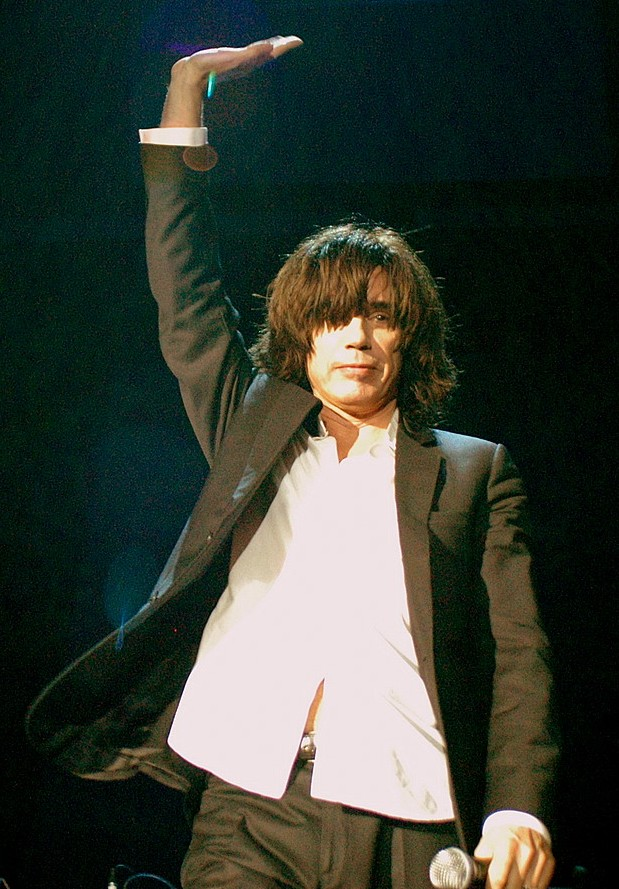
Jarre in 2008

Jean-Michel André Jarre (born 24 August 1948) is a French composer, performer and record producer. He is a pioneer in the electronic, ambient and new-age genres, and is known for organising outdoor spectacles featuring his music, accompanied by vast laser displays, large projections and fireworks.

Jarre was raised in Lyon by his mother and grandparents and trained on the piano. From an early age, he was introduced to a variety of art forms, including street performers, jazz musicians and the artist Pierre Soulages. But his musical style was perhaps most heavily influenced by Pierre Schaeffer, a pioneer of musique concrète at the Groupe de Recherches Musicales.

His first mainstream success was the 1976 album Oxygène. Recorded in a makeshift studio at his home, the album sold an estimated 18 million copies. Oxygène was followed in 1978 by Equinoxe, and in 1979, Jarre performed to a record-breaking audience of more than a million people at the Place de la Concorde, a record he has since broken three times. More albums were to follow, but his 1979 concert served as a blueprint for his future performances around the world. Several of his albums have been released to coincide with large-scale outdoor events.

He was the first Western musician officially invited to perform in the People's Republic of China and holds the world record for the largest-ever audience at an outdoor event for his Moscow concert on 6 September 1997, which was attended by 3.5 million people.

== 1970s ==
Date	Audience	Place	Event	Note
AOR Opera
21 October 1971	2,000	Palais Garnier, France		First Jarre concert
Place de la Concorde
14 July 1979	1 million	Place de la Concorde, France	Celebrate the Bastille Day	First entry in the Guinness Book Of Records.

== 1980s ==
Date	Audience	Place	Event	Note
The Concerts in China
21 October 1981	120,000	China: Beijing		First western musician to be invited to a concert after Mao's China.
22 October 1981	120,000	China: Beijing		First western musician to be invited to a concert after Mao's China.
26 October 1981	120,000	China: Shanghai		First western musician to be invited to a concert after Mao's China.
27 October 1981	120,000	China: Shanghai		First western musician to be invited to a concert after Mao's China.
29 October 1981	120,000	China: Shanghai		First western musician to be invited to a concert after Mao's China.
Rendez-vous Houston
5 April 1986	1.5 million	US: Houston	Celebrate the 150th anniversary of Houston, Texas and the NASA 25th anniversary.	Second entry in the Guinness Book Of Records.
Rendez-vous Lyon
5 October 1986	800,000	France: Lyon	The visit of Pope John Paul II to Jarre's hometown of Lyon	
Destination Docklands
8 October 1988	100,000	UK: England London Docklands		
9 October 1988	100,000	UK: England London Docklands		
Destination Trocadero
13 May 1989	15,000	France: Place Du Trocadero	Celebrate the 100th anniversary of the La dame de fer local term to refer to the tower (Iron Lady).	Performance of "London Kid" from his album Revolutions with the guitarist of The Shadows, Hank Marvin under Eiffel Tower.

== 1990s ==
Date	Audience	Place	Event	Note
Paris la Defense
14 July 1990	2.5 million	France: La Défense	Celebrate the Bastille Day	Third entry in the Guinness Book Of Records.
Swatch the World
25 September 1992	100,000	Switzerland: Zermatt		
26 September 1992	100,000	Switzerland: Zermatt		
Legends of the Lost City
1 December 1992	15,000	South Africa: Sun City	Inaugural celebration of the Palace of the Lost City, a hotel located within the Sun City resort in South Africa.	
2 December 1992	15,000	South Africa: Sun City	Inaugural celebration of the Palace of the Lost City, a hotel located within the Sun City resort in South Africa.	
3 December 1992	15,000	South Africa: Sun City	Inaugural celebration of the Palace of the Lost City, a hotel located within the Sun City resort in South Africa.	
Europe in Concert
28 July 1993	650,000	France: Mont Saint-Michel		
1 August 1993	650,000	Switzerland: Lausanne		
19 August 1993	650,000	Hungary: Puskás Ferenc Stadion		
24 August 1993	650,000	Belgium: Atomium		
28 August 1993	650,000	UK: England: Wembley Stadium		
1 September 1993	650,000	UK: England: Maine Road Stadium		
5 September 1993	650,000	France: Marseille		
11 September 1993	650,000	Germany: Waldbühne		
12 September 1993	650,000	Germany: Waldbühne		
21 September 1993	650,000	France: Montauban		
24 September 1993	650,000	France: Versailles		
29 September 1993	650,000	Spain: Santiago de Compostela		
2 October 1993	650,000	Spain: Seville		
6 October 1993	650,000	Spain: Barcelona		
16 October 1993	650,000	France: Tours		
Hong Kong
11 March 1994	50,000	China: Hong Kong	Opening of a Hong Kong Stadium	A live album called Hong Kong was released later in the year, even though most of the tracks were taken from the Europe in Concert tour.
Concert pour la Tolérance
14 July 1995	1.25 million	France: Eiffel Tower	Celebrate the Bastille Day and UNESCO's Year for Tolerance	
Festa Italiana
10 September 1995	300,000	Italy: Piazza Vittorio Veneto	Jarre performed Chronologie 4 and Rendez-Vous 4 at a show for the launch of the Brava & Bravo cars from FIAT.	
Wetten, dass
22 March 1997		Austria: Rathausplatz, Vienna	Jarre performed Oxygène 8 as pre-launch of the Oxygène 7–13 album in the TV-show Wetten, dass..? (Wanna Bet..?)	
Oxygene in Moscow
6 September 1997	3.5 million	Russia: Moscow	Jarre was invited for a concert celebrating the 850th anniversary of Moscow. His largest concert to date and a VHS tape was released in the US in 1998 and NTSC DVDs were released in Brazil, Chile and USA in 2000 and Europe version in 2007.	Fourth and last entry in the Guinness Book Of Records.
iMac Night, Apple Expo
8 September 1998	6,000	Paris Apple Expo	"Electronic Odyssee" at the 1998 Paris Apple Expo, celebrating the 50th anniversary of electronic music and the launch of the iMac. This event, known as "iMac Night", featured spectators wearing special 3D glasses to view visuals created by Jarre and Jesse Deep using the JarKaos software.	

== 2000s ==
Date	Audience	Place	Event	Note
Metamorphoses Showcase
31 January 2000	400	France: Man Ray	Promote his then new album, Métamorphoses	
Rendez-Vous in Space
1 January 2001	20,000	Japan: Ginowan Seaside Park	Celebrate the beginning of the 21st century	Jarre teamed up with Tetsuya Komuro and writer Arthur C. Clarke
Hymn to the Akropolis
19 June 2001	15,000	Greece: Odeon of Herodes Atticus	Raise money for the Greek organization Elpida	
20 June 2001	15,000	Greece: Odeon of Herodes Atticus	Raise money for the Greek organization Elpida	
Le Printemps de Bourges
12 April 2002	1,000	France: Bourges	Printemps de Bourges	
AERO – Tribute to the Wind
7 September 2002	40,000	Denmark: Gammel Vrå Enge		
Live in Beijing
October 2004	15,000	China: Forbidden City	"Year of France" cultural exchange	
October 2004	15,000	China: Tiananmen Square	"Year of France" cultural exchange	
Once Upon a Time
2 April 2005	28,000	Denmark: Parken Stadium	Jarre performed Rendez-Vous 2 for celebration of the bicentenary of Hans Christian Andersen.	
Salle des Étoiles
6 August 2005	1,500	Monaco: Sporting Monte-Carlo Casino	Casino's Summer Festival	
7 August 2005	1,000	Monaco: Sporting Monte-Carlo Casino	Casino's Summer Festival	
Space of Freedom (Solidarnosc)
26 August 2005	170,000	Poland: Gdańsk Shipyard	Celebrate the 25th anniversary of Lech Wałęsa's Solidarity movement	
LinX Live Event
10 September 2005	1,000	Belgium: Lint	Concert for opening ceremony of Eurocam Media Centre.	Jarre performed together with: Francis Rimbert, Claude Samard, and the Symphonic Factory Orchestra and Choir.
Water for Life
16 December 2006	15,000	Morocco: Merzouga		
Téo & Téa showcases
28 March 2007		Belgium" Lint	Showcase performance for the album Téo & Téa.	
15 April 2007		France: Queen Club, Paris	Showcase performance for the album Téo & Téa.	
20 May 2007		France: VIP Room, Cannes	Showcase performance for the album Téo & Téa.	
Oxygene 30th Anniversary Tour
March 2008
1 March 2008		Italy: Palazzo del Ghiaccio		
16 March 2008		UK: Scotland: Glasgow Royal Concert Hall		
18 March 2008		Ireland: National Concert Hall		
19 March 2008		Ireland: National Concert Hall		
22 March 2008		Germany: Philharmonie		
24 March 2008		Belgium: Royal Theatre		
25 March 2008		Netherlands}: Royal Theater Carré		
27 March 2008		UK: England: Symphony Hall, Birmingham		
28 March 2008		UK: England: Manchester Opera House		
30 March 2008		UK: England: Royal Albert Hall		
April–May 2008
1 April 2008		Denmark: Falconer Salen		
2 April 2008		Denmark: Falconer Salen		
4 April 2008		Sweden: Stockholm		
6 April 2008		Germany: Hamburg		
7 April 2008		Germany: Friedrichstadt-Palast		
9 April 2008		Denmark: Musikhuset		
10 April 2008		Denmark: Kulturcenter Limfjord		
12 April 2008		Norway: Konserthus		
15 April 2008		Germany: Alte Oper		
17 April 2008		Luxembourg: Rockhal		
21 April 2008		Spain: Liceu		
22 April 2008		Spain: Auditorio Palacio Municipal de Congresos		
23 April 2008		Spain: Auditorio Miguel Delibes		
25 April 2008		Portugal: Coliseu dos Recreios		
27 April 2008		Portugal: Coliseu do Porto		
29 April 2008		Spain: Salamanca		
3 May 2008		Switzerland: Hallenstadion		
November–December 2008
5 November 2008		Italy: Gran Teatro		
6 November 2008		Italy: Teatro degli Arcimboldi		
7 November 2008		Slovenia: Hala Tivoli		
8 November 2008		Serbia: Belgrade Arena		
10 November 2008		Romania: Sala Polivalenta Hall		
12 November 2008		Hungary: László Papp Budapest Sports Arena		
13 November 2008		Czech Republic: O2 Arena		
17 November 2008		Russia: State Kremlin Palace		
19 November 2008		Russia: BKZ Oktyabrsky		
21 November 2008		Russia: Grand Kremlin Palace		
23 November 2008		Latvia: Arena Riga		
25 November 2008		Lithuania: Seimens Arena		
28 November 2008		Slovakia: Pasienky Sports Hall		
29 November 2008		Slovakia: Steel Aréna		
1 December 2008		Poland: Torwar Hall		
Indoors Arena Tour (in Spanish)
May 2009
4 May 2009		Hungary: Főnix Hall		
5 May 2009		Czech Republic: CEZ Arena		
6 May 2009		Poland: Hala Stulecia		
8 May 2009		Denmark: Atletion NRGi Arena		
9 May 2009		Denmark: Hall M		
11 May 2009		Sweden: Malmö Arena		
12 May 2009		Sweden: Scandinavium		
13 May 2009		Norway: Oslo Spektrum		
14 May 2009		Sweden: Hovet		
16 May 2009		Finland: Hartwall Arena		
20 May 2009		UK: Scotland: Clyde Auditorium		
22 May 2009		UK: England: Wembley Arena		
23 May 2009		UK: England: Evening News Arena		
24 May 2009		UK: England: National Indoor Arena		
26 May 2009		Netherlands: Heineken Music Hall		
27 May 2009		Belgium: Forest National		
28 May 2009		Germany: Sporthalle Oberwerth		
30 May 2009		Switzerland: AG Hallenstadion		
March 2010
1 March 2010		Poland: Spodek		
3 March 2010		Germany: Volkswagen Halle		
4 March 2010		Germany: Color Line Arena		
5 March 2010		Germany: Max-Schmeling-Halle		
6 March 2010		Germany: König-Pilsener Arena		
9 March 2010		Germany: Porsche-Arena		
11 March 2010		Germany: Arena Leipzig		
12 March 2010		Germany: JAKO Arena		
13 March 2010		Germany: Olympiahalle		
14 March 2010		Germany: SAP Arena		
17 March 2010		France: Patinoire Mériadeck		
18 March 2010		France: Zenith		
20 March 2010		France: Le Dôme		
21 March 2010		France: Palais Nikaïa		
23 March 2010		France: Zenith		
24 March 2010		France: Halle Tony Garnier		
25 March 2010		France: Palais Omnisports de Paris-Bercy		
26 March 2010		France: Zenith		
28 March 2010		Belgium: Country Hall Ethias		
September 2010
24 May 2010		Hungary: Sports Arena		
26 May 2010		Czech Republic: Tipsport Arena		
27 May 2010		Slovakia: Sibamac Arena		
30 May 2010		Greece: The Earth Theater		
1 June 2010		Greece: Faliro Pavilion		
3 June 2010		Romania: Sala Polivalenta		
15 June 2010		Turkey: Turkcell Kurucesme Arena		
31 July 2010		Spain: Plaza del Obradoiro		
28 August 2010		Norway: Akershus Fortress (as closing artist of the Festningen 2010 Festival, included fireworks)		
18 September 2010		Lebanon: Beirut Souks		
30 September 2010		France: Le Grand Hall		
October–November 2010
3 October 2010		UK: Scotland: Braehead Arena		
4 October 2010		Ireland: 3Arena		
6 October 2010		UK: Wales: Cardiff International Arena		
8 October 2010		UK: England: NIA Academy		
9 October 2010		UK: England: Manchester Arena		
10 October 2010		UK: England: The O2 Arena		
13 October 2010		France: Zénith d'Auvergne		
14 October 2010		France: Zénith		
15 October 2010		France: Zénith Grand Quevilly		
16 October 2010		France: Zénith de Lille		
4 November 2010		France: Halle Tony Garnier		
5 November 2010		Switzerland: Geneva Arena		
6 November 2010		France: Amphitheatre Le Galaxie		
7 November 2010		France: Zénith		
11 November 2010		Poland: Ergo Arena		
13 November 2010		Poland: Orlen Arena		
14 November 2010		Poland: Hala Stulecia		
15 November 2010		Poland: Hala Podpromie		
November–December 2010
24 November 2010		France: Parc De Penfeld		
25 November 2010		France: Zenith		
26 November 2010		France: Zenith		
27 November 2010		Netherlands: Rotterdam Ahoy		
1 December 2010		France: Millesium		
2 December 2010		France: Zenith		
3 December 2010		Belgium: Sportpaleis		
8 December 2010		France: Zenith		
9 December 2010		France: Zenith		
10 December 2010		France: Zenith		
11 December 2010		France: Zenith		
May–October 2011
29 May 2011		Denmark: Jelling		
9 October 2011		Bulgaria: Arena Sofia sports hall		
10 October 2011		Serbia: Arena Beograd		
11 October 2011		Croatia: Zagrebačka Arena		
14 October 2011		Ukraine: Palace of Sports		
16 October 2011		Lithuania: Zalgirio Arena		
18 October 2011		Russia: Crocus City Hall		
20 October 2011		Russia: Ice Palace		
22 October 2011		Finland: HK Areena		
25 October 2011		Sweden: Hovet		
26 October 2011		Norway: Spectrum		
28 October 2011		Norway: Vestlandshallen		
31 October 2011		Germany: Festhalle Frankfurt		
November 2011
1 November 2011		Germany: TUI Arena		
3 November 2011		Germany: O2 World		
4 November 2011		Germany: Westfalenhalle		
5 November 2011		Germany: Lanxessarena		
7 November 2011		Germany: Messehalle		
8 November 2011		Germany: O2 World		
9 November 2011		Germany: Messehalle		
10 November 2011		Germany: Arena		
12 November 2011		Czech Republic: Hala Rondo		
13 November 2011		Poland: Spodek		
14 November 2011		Poland: Torwar		
15 November 2011		Poland: Hala Łuczniczka		
17 November 2011		Austria: Stadthalle		
18 November 2011		Austria: Stadthalle		
19 November 2011		Germany: Olympiahalle		
20 November 2011		Switzerland: AG Hallenstadion		

== 2010s ==
Date	Audience	Place	Event	Note
Live in Monaco
1 July 2011	85.000	Port Hercules, Monaco	Celebrate the Wedding of Albert II and Charlene Wittstock	
Warsaw
9 October 2012		Warsaw, Poland		
Festival International de Carthage
12 August 2013		Carthage, Tunisia		
Galactica Opening
20 December 2013		Sochi, Russia	Invite-only event for the opening of the "Galactica" center.	
The Green Concert
23 September 2018		Riyadh, Saudi Arabia	Celebrate the Saudi National Day	

== 2020s ==
Date	Audience	Place	Event	Note
Azimuth Festival
6 March 2020		Saudi Arabia, Al-'Ula		
Alone Together (VR concert)
21 June 2020		France: Paris		
Welcome to the Other Side (VR concert)
31 December 2020		France: Notre-Dame		
Versailles 400 (Mixed Reality concert)
25 December 2023		France: Hall of Mirrors, Palace of Versailles	400th anniversary of the Château de Versailles	
Bridge from the Future
12 May 2024	100.000	Slovakia: Incheba Expo, Bratislava	Opening the Starmus Festival	Guest: Brian May
2024 Summer Paralympics closing ceremony
8 September 2024	71.500	France: Stade de France		Guest live performance
Special Summer Tour 2026
22 June 2026		Greece: Stavros Niarchos Foundation Cultural Center	Release Athens 2026	SNF 30 Year Anniversary

== Bibliography ==
- Remilleux, Jean-Louis (1988), Jean-Michel Jarre (English ed.), Futura Publications Ltd, ISBN 0-7088-4263-1
- Matthews, Peter (1994), Guinness Book of Records, 41st Edition 1995, Guinness Publishing Ltd, ISBN 0-85112-736-3
- Hughes, Alex; Reader, Keith (2003), Encyclopedia of contemporary French culture, CRC Press, ISBN 0-203-00330-6
- Portico; Matlock, Glen (2008), The Little Black Book of Setlists, Anova Books, ISBN 978-1-906032-11-1
