= Rendez-vous Houston =

1986 concert by Jean Michel Jarre in Houston, Texas

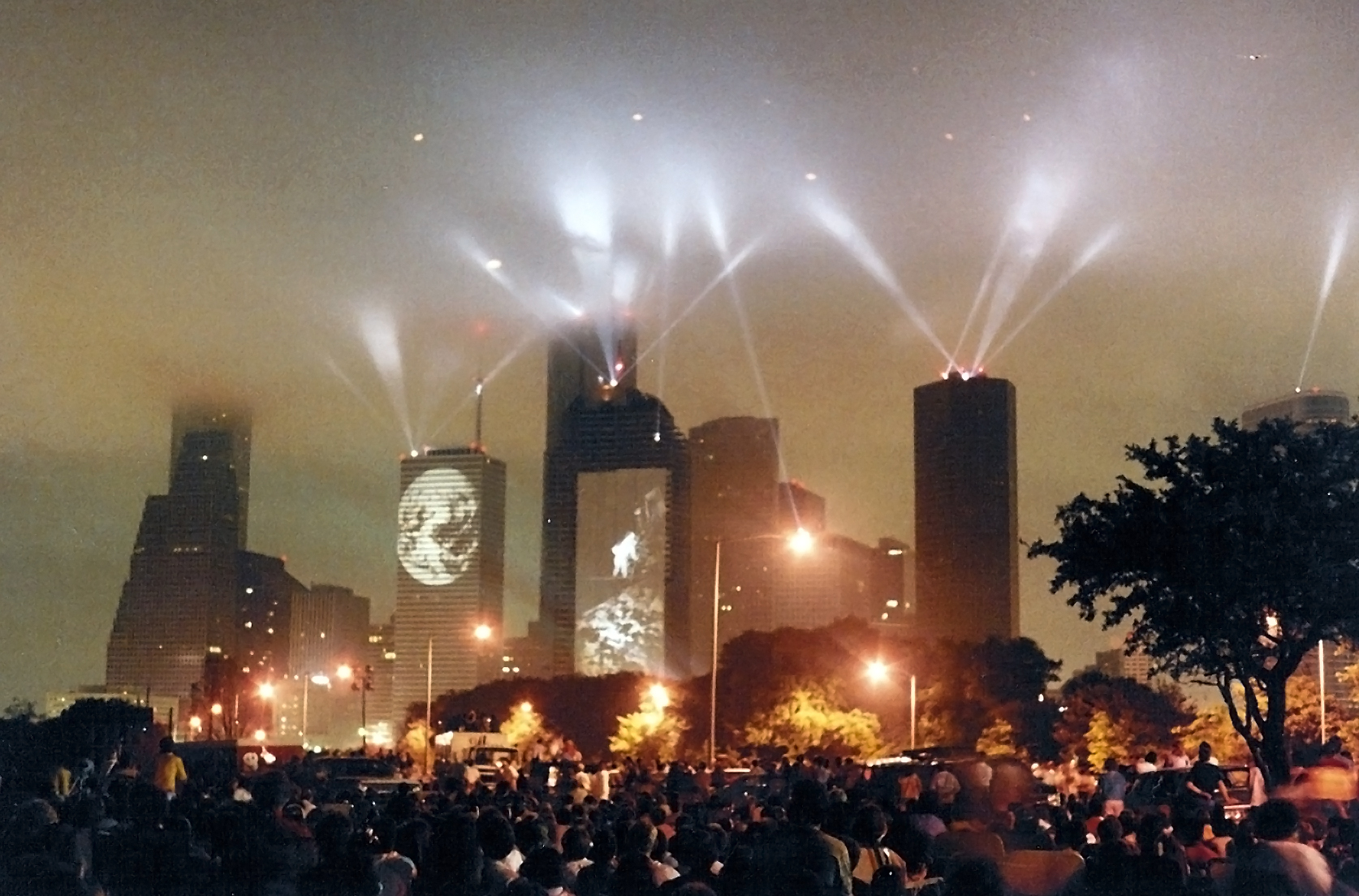
- Houston skyline during Rendez-vous Houston concert
- Genre: Rock music
- Dates: April 5, 1986
- Location: Houston
- Founders: Jean Michel Jarre

Rendez-vous Houston: A City in Concert was a live performance by musician Jean Michel Jarre amidst the skyscrapers of downtown Houston on the evening of April 5, 1986, coinciding with the release of the Rendez-Vous album. The concert celebrated the 150th anniversary of Houston, Texas and NASA's 25th anniversary. For a period of time, it held a place in the Guinness Book of Records as the largest outdoor rock concert in history, with an estimated 1.5 million in attendance, the second entry of Jarre in the book. Rendez-vous Houston also celebrated the astronauts of the Space Shuttle Challenger disaster, which had happened only two and a half months earlier. One of Jarre's friends, astronaut Ron McNair, had been killed in the disaster. Ron was originally going to play the saxophone from space during the track "Last Rendez-Vous"; his substitute for the concert was Houston native Kirk Whalum.

== Planning and problems of the concert ==
In 1985, Jarre was contacted by the musical director of the Houston Grand Opera with the proposal for him related to the celebrations of Texas' 150th birthday in 1986, 150th birthday of the city of Houston and NASA's 25th birthday. Because of NASA's involvement, Jarre got the chance to keep in contact with a friend of his, astronaut captain Bruce McCandless II who later introduced Jarre to a flight companion of his, astronaut and jazz musician Ron McNair. Together they had the idea that for the celebrations, Jarre would create a piece of music that could be performed by McNair on his saxophone. The idea was that McNair, on his next trip into space in the Challenger Space Shuttle, would perform and record onto video the new piece of music, which would then be projected through video playback onto a giant screen that was to be constructed on the front of one of the buildings.

On January 28, 1986, McNair telephoned Jarre for the last time. "...Everything's ready. See you in a week's time. Watch me on TV for the takeoff!" Later that day, the Challenger Space Shuttle disintegrated in mid-air while on its ascent into space, killing McNair and the other six crew members onboard. Distraught by what had happened, Jarre almost decided to cancel the concert. However, astronauts from NASA (including Bruce McCandless) telephoned Jarre. They asked Jarre not to cancel the concert, and hold it in tribute to pay respect to the astronauts who had lost their lives in the disaster.

The run-up to the concert itself still did not go smoothly. Rain poured down on Houston a couple of days before the concert, destroying much of the equipment on stage (which was repaired by the day of the concert), breaking wires and ruining instruments. Furthermore, there had been a very strong wind blowing all week, which ended up splitting open the giant projection screen (which was made from several small canvas panels) and causing it to come crashing down.

The local police turned up during the middle of a rehearsal demanding immediate payment of a fine; the residents who lived nearby were complaining of excessive noise and were exhausted from their sleepless nights. Also, FBI officers threatened to put a stop to the whole proceedings because they were being deprived of electricity. Thirty large lamps had been installed on top of FBI headquarters, and they were causing problems with their surveillance of Colonel Gaddafi, who was visiting the city at that time.

There was still one more slight problem before the concert started. The chief of the Houston Fire Department, Robert Clayton, had told Francis Dreyfus, Jarre's manager, that the show must be cancelled. This was due to a change of the wind direction; the Chief was concerned that the crowd would be showered with firework debris. After some back-and-forth argument with Dreyfus, Clayton agreed that the concert could proceed on a 'see how it goes' term.

During the concert (specifically, during the performance of "Equinoxe Part 5", from Equinoxe), the amount of fireworks being used and the direction of the wind did indeed cause debris to rain down on the audience, covering them in ash. Clayton frantically began to try to stop the proceedings, fearing that people would be injured. Although his fears were duly noted, the crowd took no notice of the ash falling onto them and carried on enjoying the concert proceedings.

== Video and Audio Release ==
A 52 minute TV edit of the concert was produced for broadcast, later released on VHS tape. Only around 35 minutes (7 tracks) from the concert are included in the film, with the first 15 minutes consisting of documentary footage with background music of other tracks from the concert. No further video releases from the concert have taken place since. Two tracks from Houston appear on the live album In Concert Houston/Lyon (re-released as Cities In Concert Houston/Lyon): "Equinoxe Part 5" and "Equinoxe Part 7" (1997 edition only). The full radio broadcast from the concert is available on YouTube, as are various audience camcorder recordings of the concert.

== Track listing ==
- "Ethnicolor part 1" (Available on VHS)

Rural Space

- "Oxygène Part 1" (from Oxygène)
- "Oxygène Part 2"
- "Oxygène Part 4"
- "Equinoxe Part 7" (VHS and CD) (from Equinoxe)
- "Souvenir of China"

Urban Space

- "Equinoxe Part 4"
- "Equinoxe Part 2"
- "Equinoxe Part 5" (VHS and CD)

Outer Space

- "Rendez-Vous 3" (VHS) (from Rendez-Vous)
- "Rendez-Vous 2" (VHS)
- "Oxygène Part 5"
- "Last Rendez-Vous - Ron's Piece" (VHS)
- "Rendez-Vous 4" (VHS)
- "Rendez-Vous 4" - Encore

=== Musicians ===
- Jean Michel Jarre: Keyboards, laser harp
- Michel Geiss: Keyboards
- Sylvain Durand: Keyboards
- Dominique Perrier: Keyboards
- Francis Rimbert: Keyboards
- Pascal Lebourg: Keyboards
- Jo Hammer: Drums
- Dino Lumbroso: Percussions
- Kirk Whalum: Alto Saxophone
- Christine Durand: Soprano
- The High School for the Performing and Visual Arts: Dance
- The Singing Boys of Houston (93 singers); The High School for the Performing & Visual Arts (7 sopranos): Choir

== See also ==
- Space Shuttle Challenger disaster
- Ron McNair
- List of Jean Michel Jarre concerts
- List of highest-attended concerts

== Bibliography ==
- Remilleux, Jean-Louis (1988), Jean-Michel Jarre (English ed.), Futura Publications Ltd, ISBN 0-7088-4263-1
- Hughes, Alex; Reader, Keith (2003), Encyclopedia of contemporary French culture, CRC Press, ISBN 0-203-00330-6
- Portico; Matlock, Glen (2008), The Little Black Book of Setlists, Anova Books, ISBN 978-1-906032-11-1
