= Ronald McNair =

American astronaut and physicist (1950–1986)

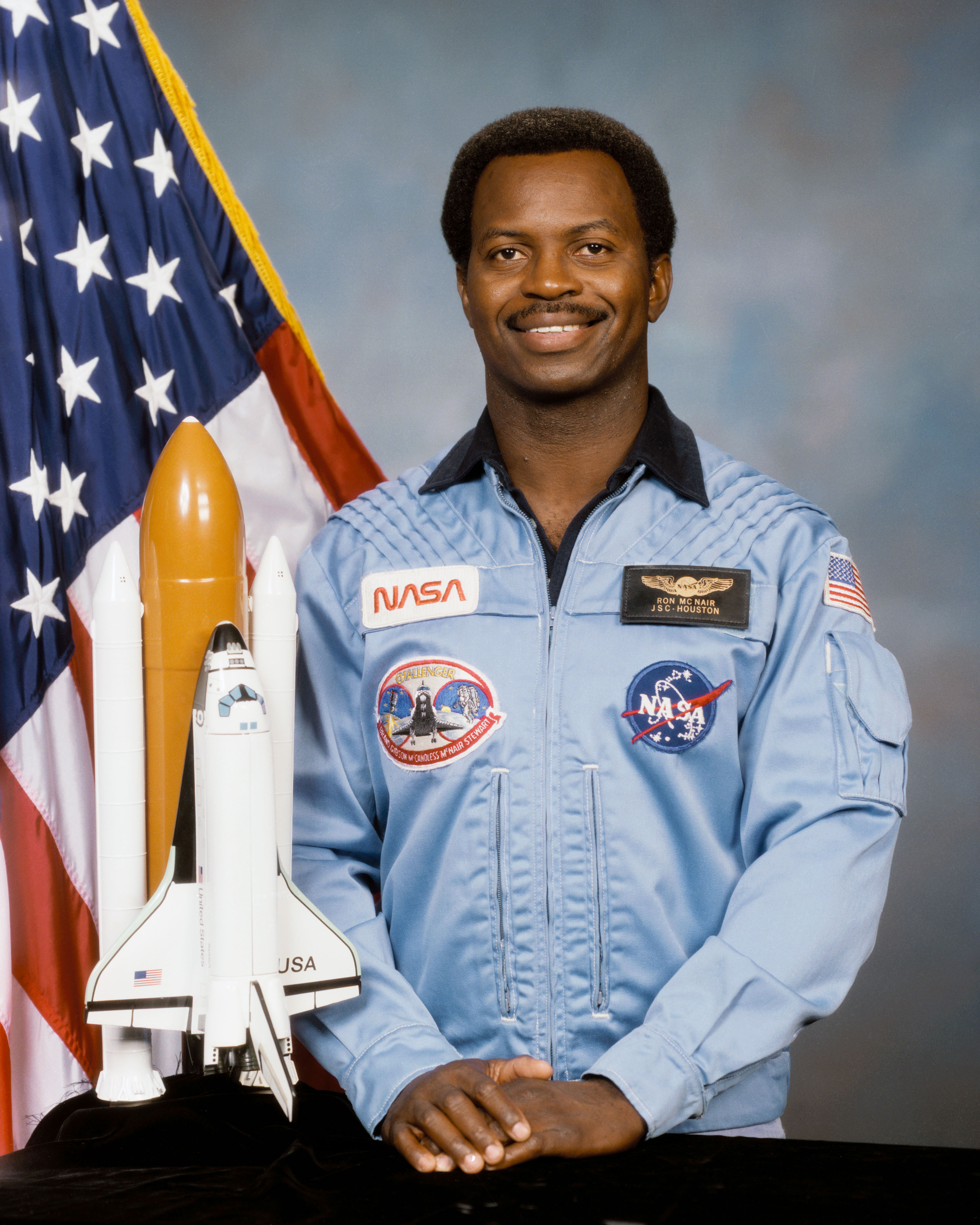
- McNair in 1985
- Born: Ronald Erwin McNair; October 21, 1950; Lake City, South Carolina, U.S.
- Died: January 28, 1986 (aged 35); North Atlantic Ocean
- Cause of death: Space Shuttle Challenger disaster
- Education: North Carolina A&T State University (BS); Massachusetts Institute of Technology (MS, PhD)
- Awards: Congressional Space Medal of Honor
- Space career

NASA astronaut
- Time in space: 7d 23h 15m
- Selection: NASA Group 8 (1978)
- Missions: STS-41-B; STS-51-L
- Scientific career
- Thesis: Energy Absorption and Vibrational Heating in Molecules Following Intense Laser Excitation (1977)
- Doctoral advisor: Michael Stephen Feld

Ronald Erwin McNair (October 21, 1950 – January 28, 1986) was an American NASA astronaut and physicist. He died at the age of 35 during the launch of the Space Shuttle Challenger on mission STS-51-L, in which he was serving as one of three mission specialists in a crew of seven.

Prior to the Challenger disaster, McNair flew as a mission specialist on STS-41-B aboard Challenger from February 3 to 11, 1984, becoming the second Black American in space behind Guion Bluford who was the first Black American in space in 1983, aboard the very same space shuttle.

== Background ==
Ronald Erwin McNair was born in Lake City, South Carolina, on October 21, 1950, to Carl C. McNair, an auto repairman, and his wife, a high school teacher named Pearl. Growing up alongside his older brother, Carl S., as well as his younger brother, Eric, McNair grew up in a low-income household, his home having lacked both electricity and running water. The family later moved into a better, though still poor-quality household following the death of McNair's grandfather. His older brother, writing in a posthumous biography about McNair, described how the family "covered the floor and furniture with pots and pans to catch the water dripping through the roof" when it rained.

In the summer of 1959, McNair refused to leave the segregated Lake City Public Library without being allowed to check out his books. After the police and his mother were called, McNair was allowed to borrow books from the library; the building that housed the library at the time is now named after him.

McNair attended Lake City Elementary School and Carver High School, where he graduated as valedictorian in 1967.

In 1971, McNair received a Bachelor of Science degree in physics, magna cum laude, from the North Carolina Agricultural and Technical State University in Greensboro, North Carolina. At North Carolina A&T, he studied under professor Donald Edwards, who had established the physics curriculum at the university.

In 1976, McNair received a PhD degree in physics from the Massachusetts Institute of Technology under the guidance of Michael Feld, becoming nationally recognized for his work in the field of laser physics. That same year, McNair won the AAU Karate gold medal. He would subsequently win five regional championships and earn a fifth-degree black belt in karate.

McNair received four honorary doctorates, as well as a score of fellowships and commendations. He became a staff physicist at the Hughes Research Lab in Malibu, California. McNair was also a member of the Omega Psi Phi Fraternity.

== Astronaut career ==
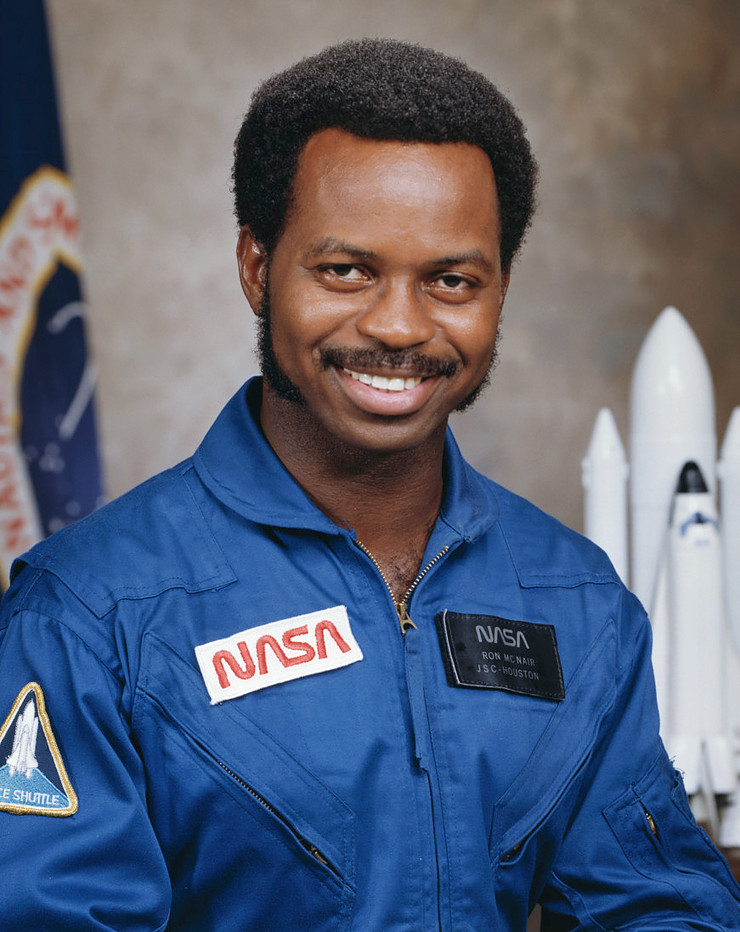
McNair in the 1980s

In 1978, McNair was selected as one of 35 applicants from a pool of 10,000 for the NASA astronaut program. He was one of several astronauts recruited by Nichelle Nichols as part of a NASA effort to increase the number of minority and female astronauts.

McNair flew as a mission specialist on STS-41-B aboard Challenger from February 3 to 11, 1984, becoming the second Black American to fly in space.

=== Challenger disaster ===
Following the STS-41-B mission, McNair was selected for STS-51-L as one of three mission specialists in a crew of seven. The mission launched on January 28, 1986. He and the other six crew members were killed when Challenger disintegrated nine miles above the Atlantic Ocean, 73 seconds after liftoff.

McNair was initially buried at Rest Lawn Memorial Park in Lake City, South Carolina. His remains were disinterred in 2004 and moved to Ronald E. McNair Memorial Park, located elsewhere in Lake City.

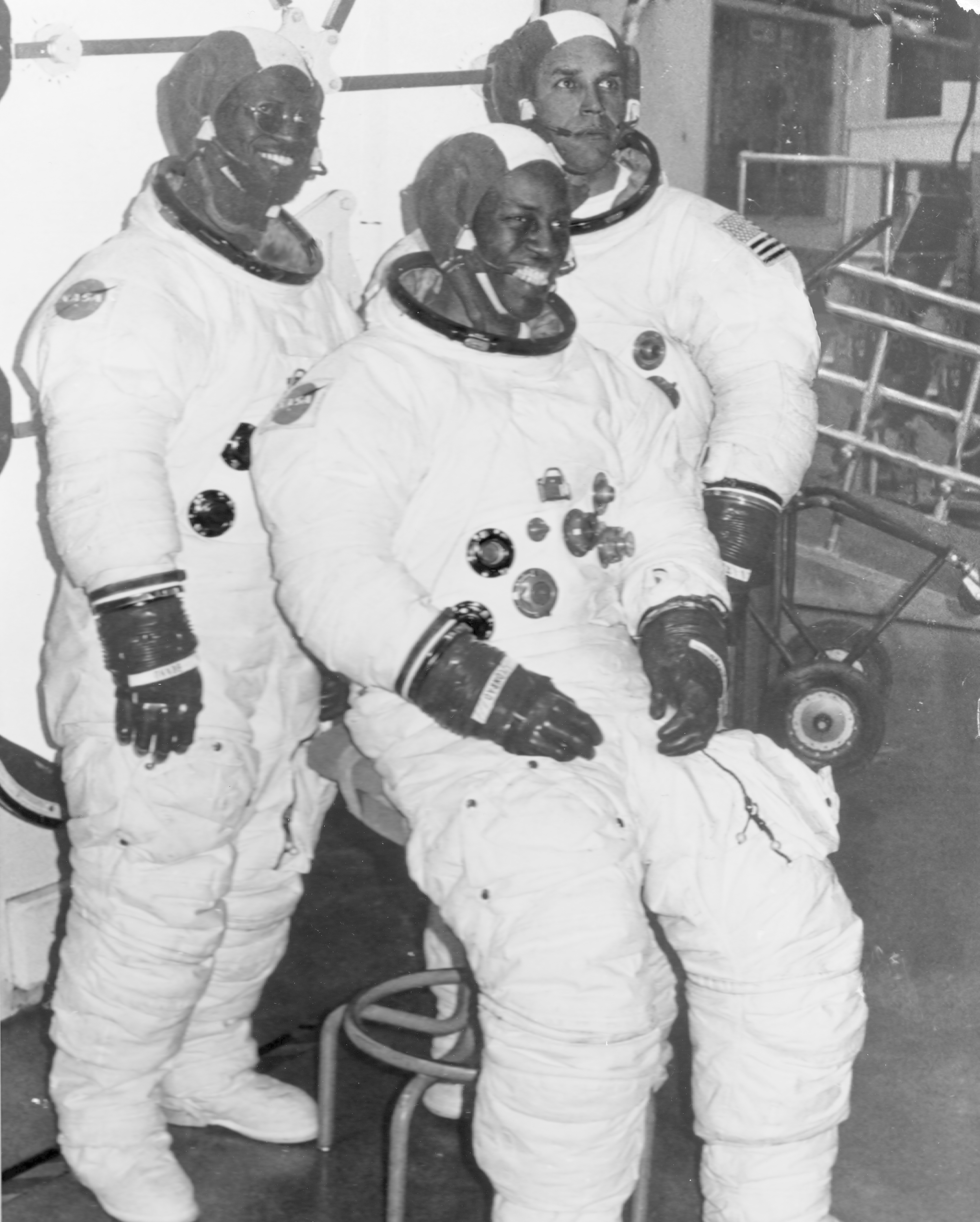
Astronaut candidates Ron McNair, Guy Bluford, and Fred Gregory wearing Apollo spacesuits, May 1978.

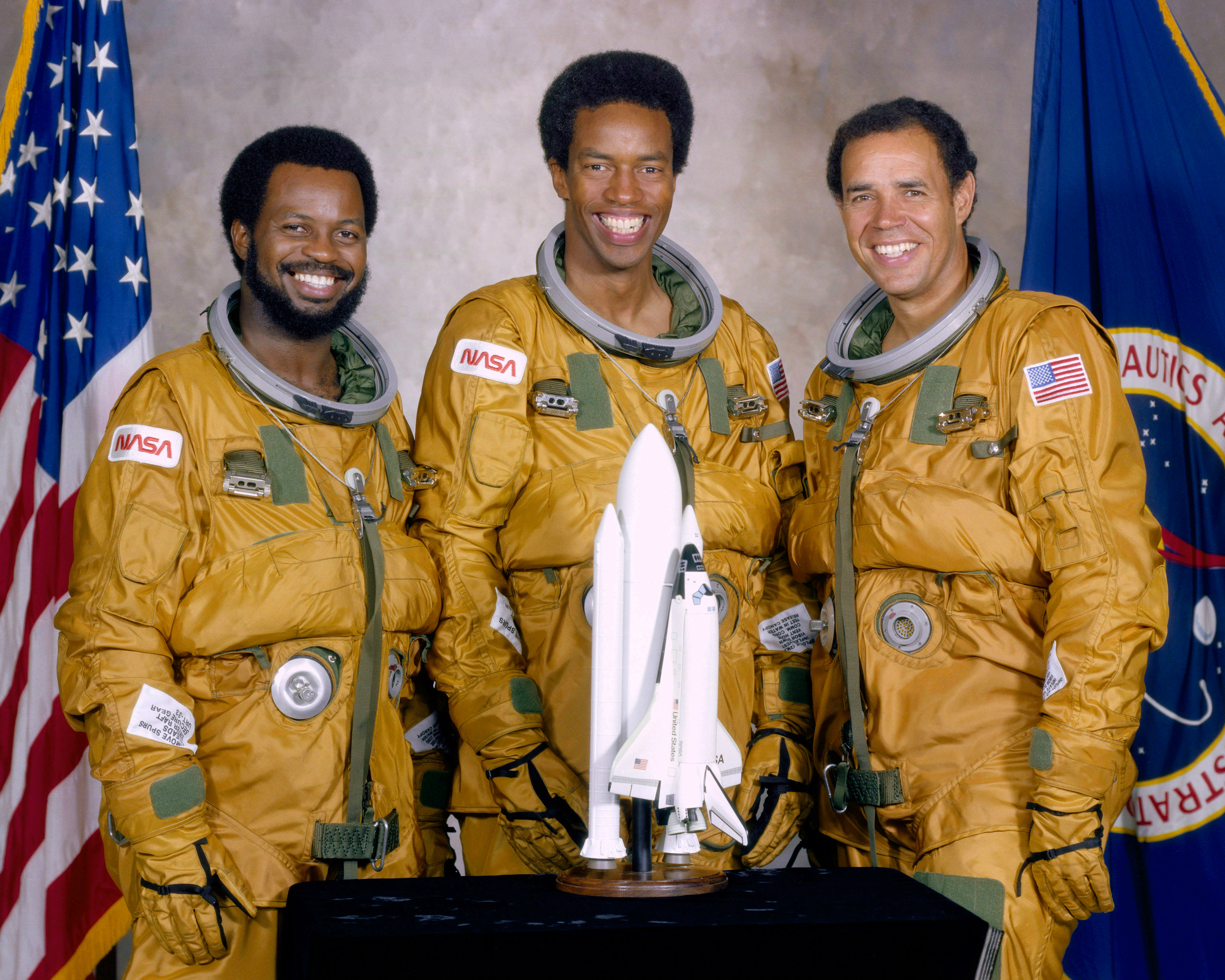
First three Black American astronauts to go to space, including McNair, Guy Bluford and Fred Gregory from the class of 1978 selection of astronauts.

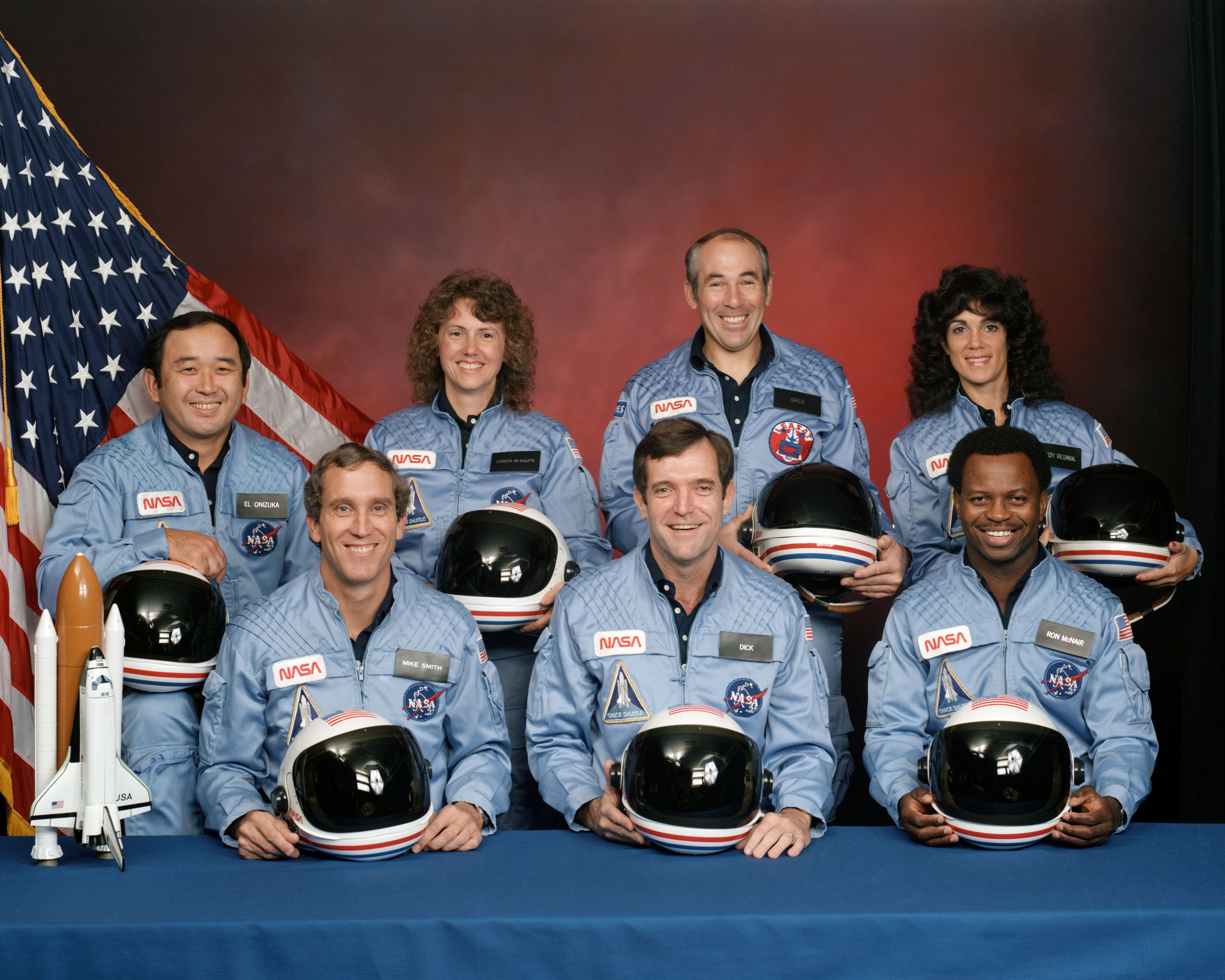
Challenger crew: (front row) Michael J. Smith, Dick Scobee, Ronald McNair; (back row) Ellison Onizuka, Christa McAuliffe, Gregory Jarvis, Judith Resnik

== Music in space ==
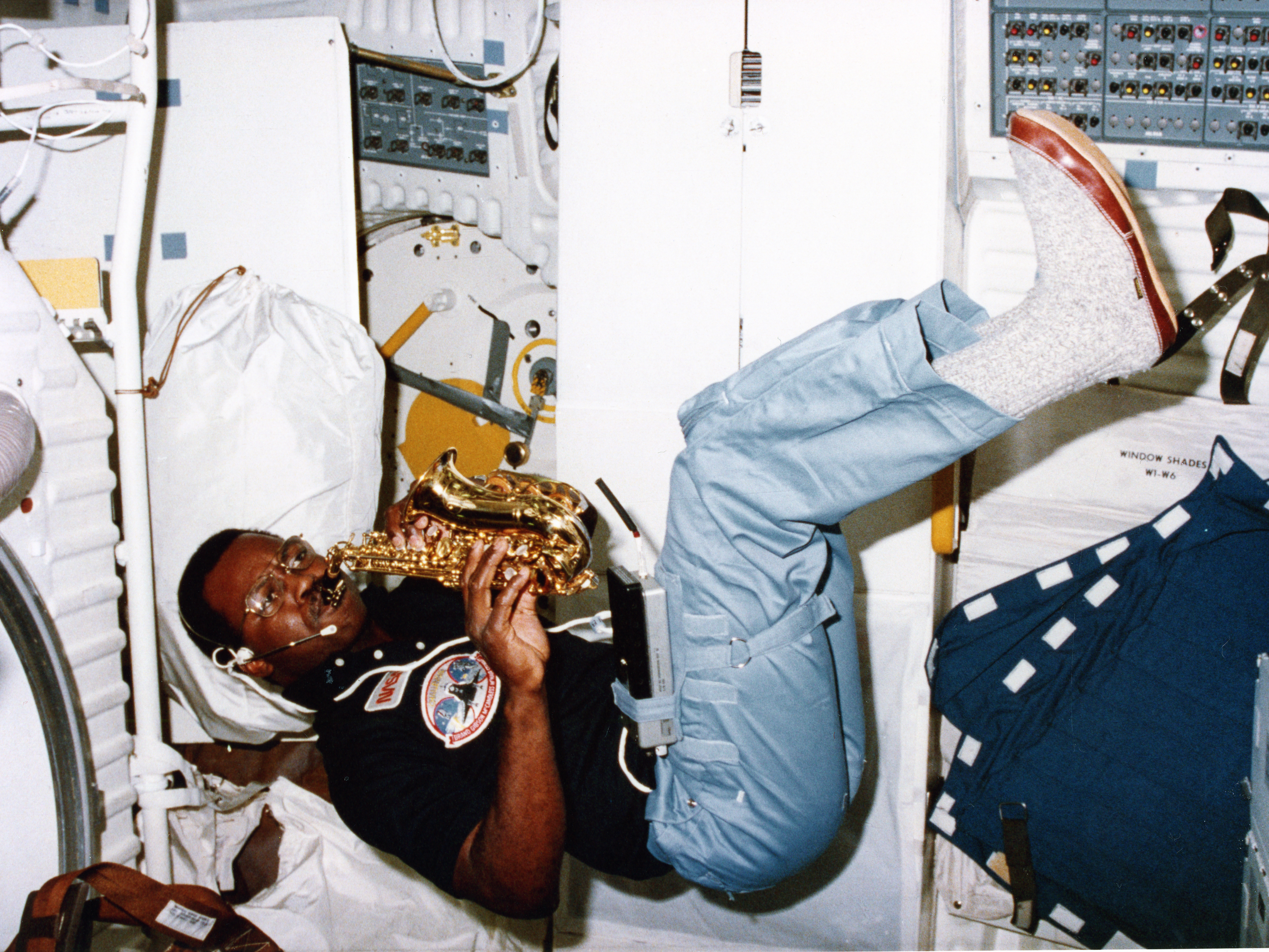
McNair plays the saxophone aboard Space Shuttle Mission 41-B.

McNair was an accomplished saxophonist and jazz enthusiast.

Before his last fateful space mission, McNair worked with French composer and performer Jean-Michel Jarre on a piece of music for Jarre's then-upcoming album Rendez-Vous. It was intended that McNair would record his saxophone solo on board the Challenger, which would have made McNair's solo the first original piece of music to have been recorded in space (although the song "Jingle Bells" had been played on a harmonica during an earlier Gemini 6 spaceflight). However, the recording was never made, as the flight ended in the disaster and the deaths of its entire crew. The final track on Rendez-Vous, "Last Rendez-Vous," has the subtitle "Ron's Piece," and the liner notes include a dedication from Jarre: "Ron was so excited about the piece that he rehearsed it continuously until the last moment. May the memory of my friend the astronaut and the artist Ron McNair live on through this piece." McNair was supposed to have taken part in Jarre's Rendez-vous Houston concert through a live feed from the orbiting Shuttlecraft.

== Public honors ==
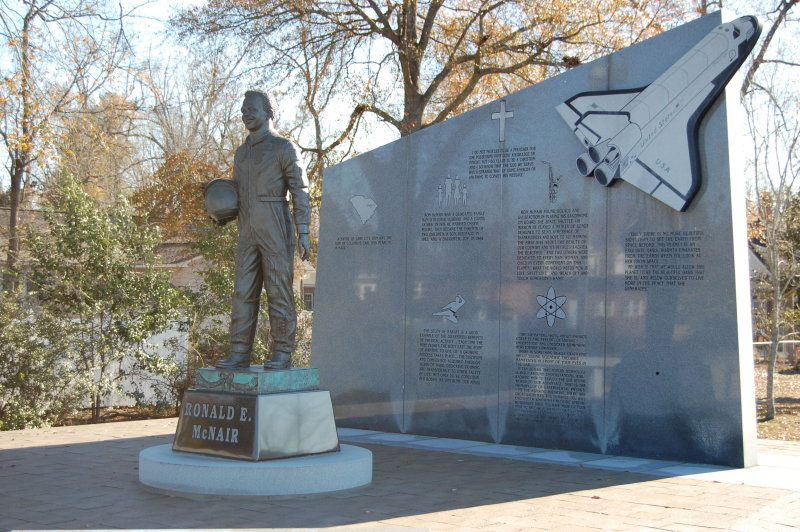
Dr. Ronald E. McNair memorial in his hometown, Lake City, South Carolina

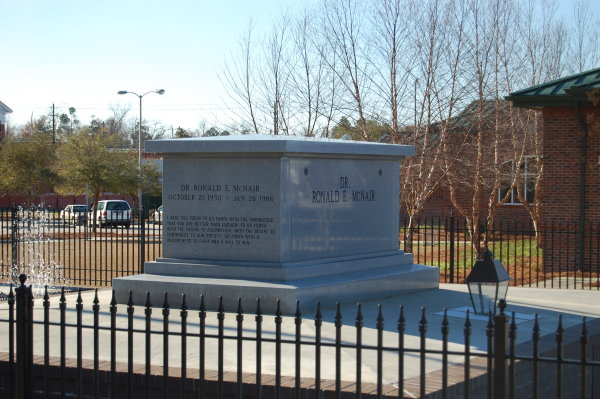
Dr. Ronald E. McNair tomb in his hometown, Lake City, South Carolina

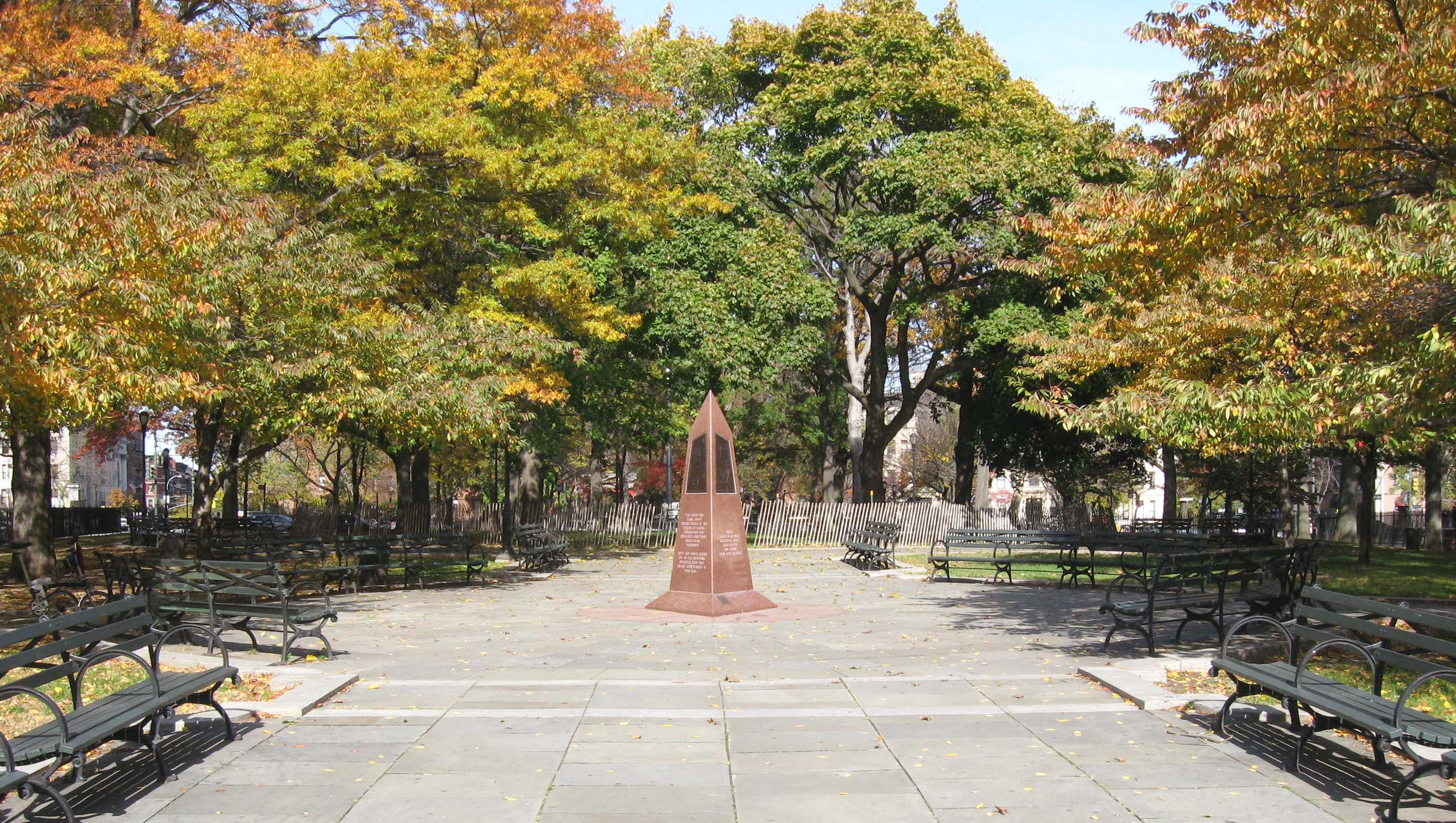
Ronald McNair Park in Brooklyn, New York City

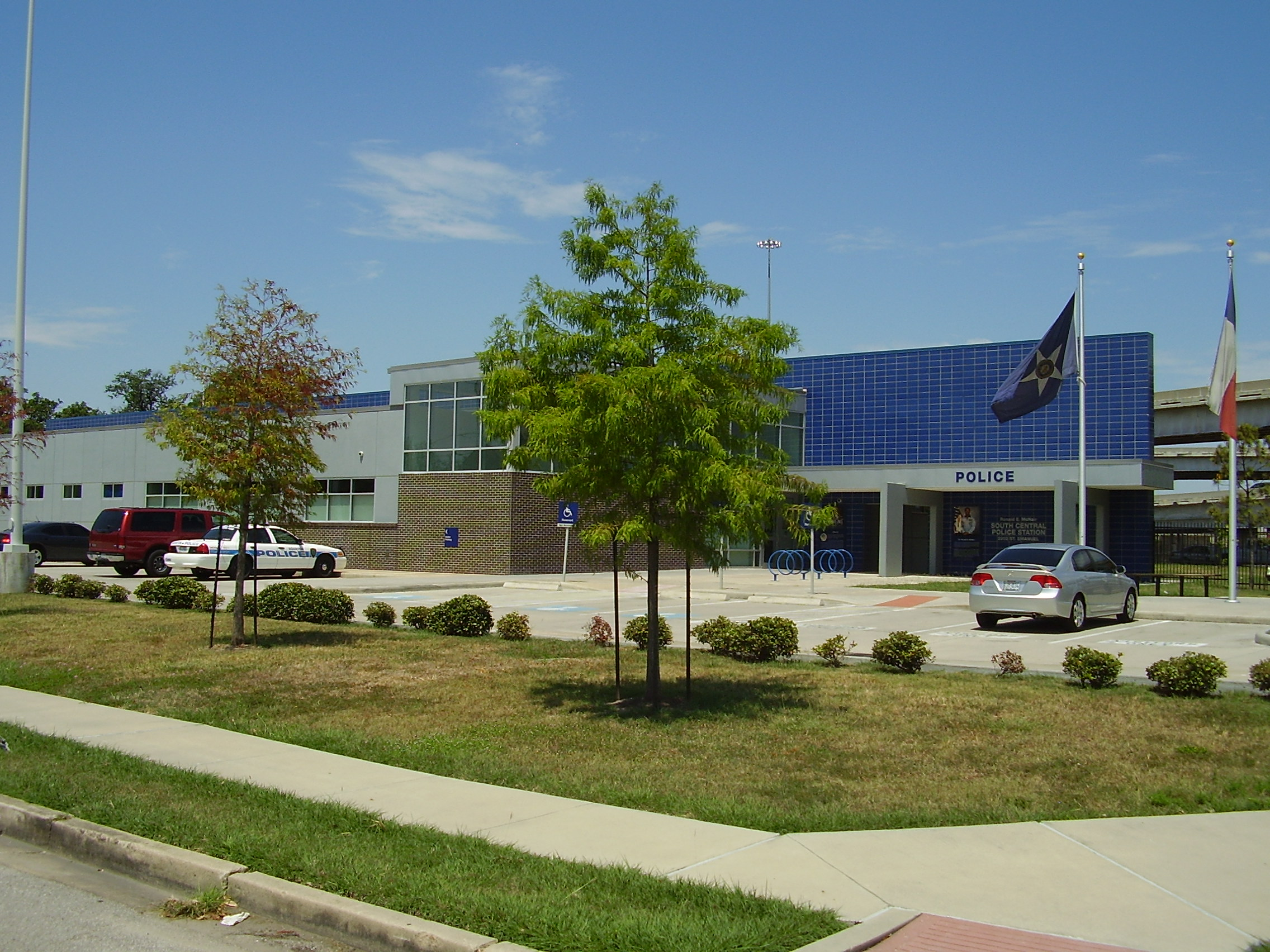
Ronald E. McNair South Central Police Station of the Houston Police Department in Houston, Texas

McNair was posthumously awarded the Congressional Space Medal of Honor in 2004, along with all crew members lost in the Challenger and Columbia disasters.

A variety of public places, people and programs have been renamed in honor of McNair:

- The crater McNair on the Moon is named in his honor.
- The McNair Building (a.k.a. Building 37) at MIT, his alma mater, houses the Kavli Institute for Astrophysics and Space Research.
- The McNair Science Center at Francis Marion University in Florence, South Carolina
- The McNair Center for Aerospace Innovation and Research at the University of South Carolina is named in his honor.
- The McNair Park & Recreation Center in Pompano Beach, Florida is named in his honor.
- Ronald McNair Boulevard in Lake City, South Carolina is named in his honor and lies near other streets named for astronauts who perished in the Challenger crash.
- The Quailbrook East development in Somerset, New Jersey has streets named after the Challenger and each of the seven astronauts.
- The U.S. Department of Education offers the TRIO Ronald E. McNair Post-Baccalaureate Achievement Program for students with low-income, first-generation students, and/or underrepresented students in graduate education for doctorate education.
- On January 29, 2011, the Lake City, South Carolina library was dedicated as the Ronald McNair Life History Center. When Ronald McNair was nine, the police and his mother were called because he wished to check out books from this library, which served only white patrons before he arrived. He said, "I'll wait," to the lady and sat on the counter until the police and his mother arrived, and the officer said, "Why don't you just give him the books?" which the lady behind the counter reluctantly did. He said, "Thank you, ma'am," as he got the books.
- Numerous K–12 schools have also been named after McNair.
  - McNair Elementary School in Compton, California
  - Los Robles Ronald McNair Academy in East Palo Alto, California
  - Ronald McNair Elementary School in Germantown, Maryland
  - Ronald E. McNair Elementary School in Hazelwood, Missouri
  - PS 5, Dr. Ronald McNair School in Brooklyn, New York City, New York
  - PS/MS 147 Ronald McNair in Cambria Heights Queens, New York City, New York
  - Ronald McNair Elementary School in Greensboro, North Carolina
  - Ronald E. McNair Elementary School in Dallas, Texas (Dallas ISD)
  - Ronald Ervin McNair Elementary School in Denton, Texas (Denton ISD)
  - Ronald McNair Middle School in Rockledge, Florida
  - Ronald McNair Middle School in DeKalb County, Georgia, near Decatur
  - Ronald McNair Middle School in College Park, Georgia
  - Ronald McNair Middle School, formerly the Andrew Jackson Intermediate School, in Detroit, Michigan
  - Ronald E. McNair Middle School in Lake City, South Carolina, was renamed from Carver High School in his honor (he was a high school graduate of the facility).
  - Ronald E. McNair Middle School, San Antonio, Texas – Southwest ISD
  - Ronald E. McNair Junior High School in Huntsville, Alabama
  - Dr. Ronald McNair Junior High School in Pearland, Texas (Alvin Independent School District), is named in honor Dr. McNair.
  - Ronald E. McNair High School in Stockton, California
  - Dr. Ronald E. McNair High School in DeKalb County, Georgia, near Decatur
  - Dr. Ronald E. McNair Academic High School in Jersey City, New Jersey
  - Ronald E. McNair Academic Center in Chicago, Illinois
  - Ronald E. McNair Building: Lycée Français de la Nouvelle-Orléans, New Orleans, Louisiana
  - Ronald E. McNair Building: KIPP Believe College Prep, New Orleans, Louisiana
  - Ronald E. McNair Administrative Center in University City, Missouri
- Ronald E. McNair Prince Hall Masonic Lodge No. 146 is named in his honor in Suitland, Maryland
- A building on the Willowridge High School campus in Houston, Texas, is named in honor of McNair.
- McNair Memorial Park in El Lago, Texas, is named in his honor.
- In his honor, there is a memorial in Dr. Ronald McNair Park in Prospect Heights, Brooklyn, New York.
- The Dr. Ronald E. McNair Playground in East Harlem, Manhattan, New York City, New York, is named after him.
- The Ronald E. McNair Space Theater inside the Davis Planetarium in downtown Jackson, Mississippi, is named in his honor.
- The McNair Open Access Computer Lab at California State University, Bakersfield
- The Naval ROTC building on the campus of Southern University and A&M College in Baton Rouge, Louisiana, is named in his honor.
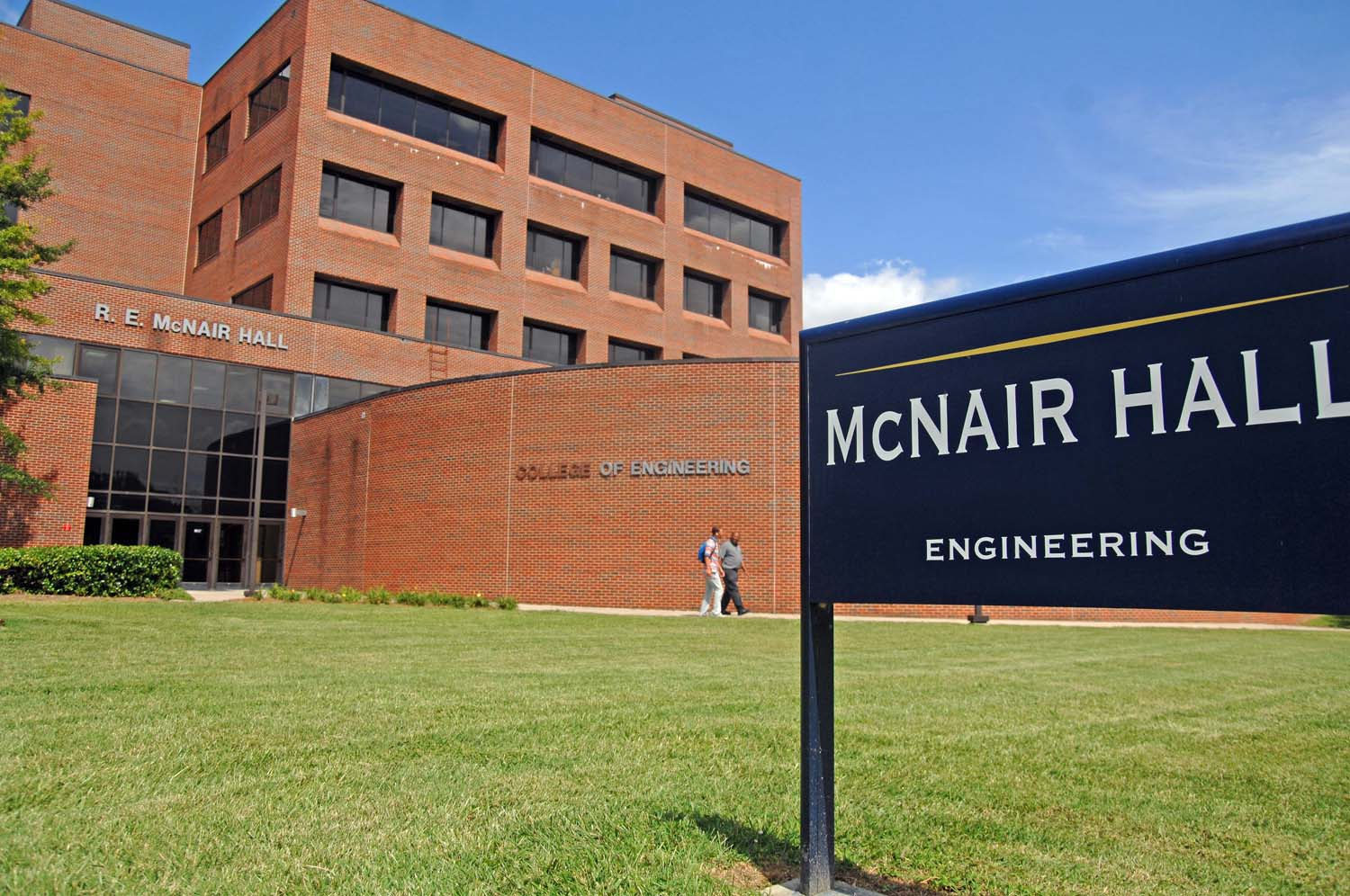
  Ronald E. McNair Hall, on the campus of North Carolina A&T State University in Greensboro, North Carolina
- The Engineering building at North Carolina A&T State University in Greensboro, North Carolina, is named in his honor. The university holds a McNair Day celebration annually.
- The federally-funded McNair Scholars/Achievement Programs award research money and internships to juniors and seniors who are first-generation and low-income, or members of underrepresented groups, in preparation for graduate study. 187 institutions participate (as of 2020). Michigan State University, Washington State University, and Syracuse University are three examples of these programs and both offer Summer Research Opportunity Program as additional program components.

== In popular culture ==
- McNair was portrayed by Joe Morton in the 1990 TV movie Challenger.
- The song "A Drop Of Water", recorded by Japanese jazz artist Keiko Matsui, with vocals by the late Carl Anderson, was written in tribute to McNair.
- The Jean Michel Jarre track "Last Rendez-Vous" was re-titled "Ron's Piece" in his honor. McNair was originally due to record the track in space aboard Challenger, and then perform it via a live link up in Jarre's Rendez-vous Houston concert.
- A 2009 children's book Ron's Big Mission, illustrated by Don Tate, recounts the story of nine-year-old McNair challenging the whites-only policy of his town's public library.
- In a 2013 animated short film Eyes on the Stars, McNair's brother Carl McNair recounts Ronald McNair's childhood.
- The third movement of Carlos Simon's 2023 wind quintet Giants is eponymously titled in dedication to Ronald McNair. This five-movement work invokes McNair and other Black American thinkers and creatives who have "influenced [Simon] and [his] identity as a composer [...] offer[ing] a character study of music through their work".

== Personal life ==
McNair was married to Cheryl McNair, and they had two children. Cheryl is a founding director of the Challenger Center, which focuses on space science education.

== See also ==
- List of African-American astronauts
- Ronald E. McNair Post-Baccalaureate Achievement Program
- Rendez-vous Houston
