= Seiko DS-250 =

DS-250
- Manufacturer: Seiko
- Dates: 1985

Technical specifications
- Polyphony: 8 voice
- Timbrality: 1 part
- Oscillator: Sine
- LFO: 1
- Synthesis type: Digital Additive
- Filter: No
- Storage memory: 4 user memory
- Effects: Chorus

Input/output
- Keyboard: 61 keys
- Left-hand control: Pitch bend wheel
- External control: MIDI In, out, thru

The DS-250 was an electronic keyboard manufactured in 1985 by Seiko and was considered a commercial failure. It was capable of generating both digital and additive sounds. It is expandable with two expander units DS-310 and DS-320.

== Features ==
The unit used additive synthesis for sound generation, chorus and ports included MIDI In, Out and Through, RCA outputs (stereo), Headphones and level controls for both channels. It also has on board speakers. It is capable of running either a single sound or two sounds at once, either layered or split, and each of these can be used on its own MIDI channel (there are small dials on the end of the keyboard to set each channel).

There are 16 preset sounds and these are all editable within a very limited context of volume, sustain (3 levels) and a variable vibrato (with vibrato delay switch). You can change the detune and pitch intervals between the two layered sounds.

== DS1000 sequencer ==
A MIDI 1000 note sequencer called the DS1000 was also produced for use with the DS-250 (and other MIDI devices) in 1986. It had four buttons Record, play, stop and pause, a tempo slider.

== Famous Users ==
- Jean-Michel Jarre First Rendez-vous and Last Rendez-vous (Ron's piece) from the album Rendez-Vous.

== Sounds ==
Mostly known for its pad and bell type sounds.
