= Destination Docklands =

1988 Jean-Michel Jarre concerts in London

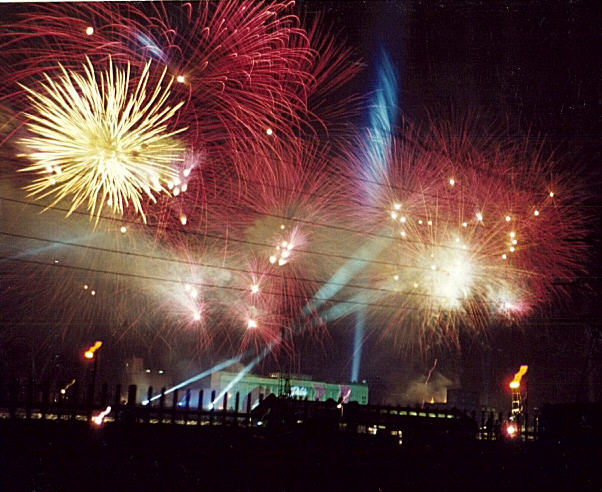
The fireworks at the concert

Destination Docklands was an event consisting of two concerts by musician Jean-Michel Jarre on the Royal Victoria Docks, Docklands, London, on Saturday 8 and Sunday 9 October 1988, to coincide with the release of Jarre's new album Revolutions. The concerts were attended by 100,000 people on each night.

Accompanied by fireworks and a light show, the concert also featured The Shadows guitarist Hank Marvin who joined Jarre on the tracks "London Kid" and "Fourth Rendez-Vous". The show was intended to show a history of the area, with tracks dedicated to the Industrial Revolution, Swinging Sixties (with Hank Marvin), and future regeneration of the area. The concert's scale was larger than any seen in the UK before or since, and used vast numbers of fireworks, World War II searchlights, and used entire buildings as giant projection screens throughout the show. The majority of the audience watched from disused land on what is now the site of the ExCeL Exhibition Centre.

Originally planned as a one-off event, it was scheduled for 24 September 1988, but Jarre and his crew had to battle constantly with Newham Council and London Fire Brigade over logistical and safety concerns. Although the organisers publicly sought other venues in the meantime, a compromise was reached in which the event was split into two concerts to spread the crowds over two nights. These concerts went ahead on 8 and 9 October 1988. Weather throughout the buildup to the event was extremely rainy, and while the first concert narrowly avoided the downpours, much of the second took place in heavy rain – prompting Jarre to quip in his address thanking the crowd for coming, "Frogs like rain!"

The floating stage was specially built, and made up of several barges brought in from the north of England and welded together to create what Jarre termed his "battleship". Jarre's original intention was for the stage to traverse the Royal Victoria Docks, but this was not possible due to the poor weather and health and safety concerns. The show attracted an estimated live audience of 200,000, not including those in parks surrounding the venue listening to the concert on a simultaneous broadcast on Radio 1. The concert programme featured drawings of the redevelopment works due to take place in the years after the concerts, as did some of the projections on the building facades.

The Saturday performance was broadcast on Radio 1. The Sunday show, during which it rained heavily, was recorded for later broadcast and release. In 1989 a 54-minute live CD and Cassette were released as Jarre Live, later repackaged as Destination Docklands. This included 11 of the 17 tracks performed at the concert, albeit with edits to some pieces.

A 50-minute TV edit was produced for broadcast and was shown in the UK on Channel 4 at 10:40pm on Christmas Day 1988. This edit was released on VHS video in 1989. It has yet to be released on DVD. This version is broadly the same as the live album release, however with "Computer Weekend" omitted. No TV footage exists of the 7 tracks not included on the VHS release, however audience camcorder footage is available on YouTube. Of the 6 tracks not included on the live album, only recordings of the radio broadcast exist, also on YouTube. However, the quality of the broadcast is affected by a large amount of echo and distortion.

More fireworks

== Track listing for concert ==
Part 1: Industrial Revolution

- Industrial Revolution: Overture (Available on VHS/CD)
- Industrial Revolution: Parts 1-3 (VHS/CD)
- Equinoxe 5 (Not released)
- Ethnicolor (Not released)

Part 2: Swinging Sixties

- Computer Weekend (CD)
- Les Chants Magnétiques II / Magnetic Fields II (VHS/CD)
- Oxygène 4*(VHS/CD)
- Equinoxe 7 (Not released)
- London Kid (with Hank Marvin) (VHS/CD)

Part 3: The Nineties

- Third Rendez-Vous / Laser Harp (Not released)
- Tokyo Kid (Not released)
- Revolutions* (VHS/CD)
- Souvenir de Chine / Souvenir of China (Not released)
- Second Rendez-Vous* (VHS/CD)
- Fourth Rendez-Vous* (with Hank Marvin) (VHS/CD)

Part 4: The Finale

- September (VHS/CD)
- The Emigrant (VHS/CD)

== Musicians ==
- Jean-Michel Jarre: Synthesizers
- Michel Geiss: Synthesizers
- Dominique Perrier: Synthesizers
- Francis Rimbert: Synthesizers
- Guy Delacroix: Bass
- Jo Hammer: Drums
- Dino Lumbroso: Percussions
- Sylvain Durand: Synthesizers
- Christine Durand: Soprano
- Hank Marvin: Guitar on London Kid and Fourth Rendez-Vous
- Mireille Pombo: Vocals on September
- Sori Bamba: Conductor of Mali Choir on September
- Kudsi Erguner: Turkish Flute on Revolutions
- Bruno Rossignol: Choir Conductor
- Xavier Bellenger: Ethnical Music Advisor
- Setsuko Yamada: Solo Dance Performance
