= Yamaha KX-5 =

- Manufacturer: Yamaha
- Dates: 1984

Technical specifications
- Oscillator: None
- Synthesis type: MIDI Controller

Input/output
- Keyboard: 37 Keys

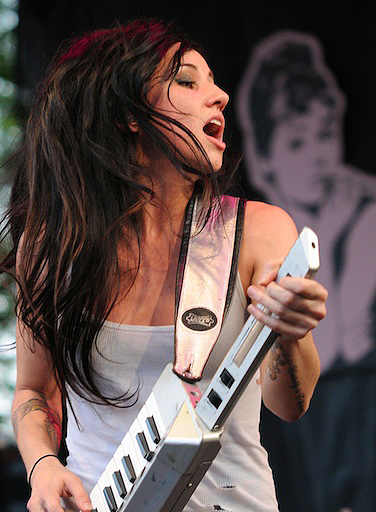

The Yamaha KX-5 is a MIDI controller and has no actual sounds on board. It was created by Yamaha in 1984. It also featured a ribbon controller which could be used for pitch bend. It is powered by 6 AA batteries which has a run time for up to 7 hours.

== Keyboard ==
It has 37 Keys which range from C2-C5.

== Finishes ==
The unit was produced in both silver and black.
