= Francis Rimbert =

French musician and composer (born 1952)

- Born: 3 October 1952 (age 73)
- Origin: Val d'Oise, France
- Genres: Electronic, instrumental, new-age, ambient, lounge
- Occupations: Pianist, Keyboardist, Composer, Musician, Artist
- Instruments: Piano, Synthesizer, keyboard
- Labels: C.ZEN PROD, Atomic Quill Music
- Website: www.francisrimbert.com

Francis Rimbert (born 3 October 1952 in Val d'Oise, France) is a French musician and composer.

== Biography ==
Francis Rimbert started playing classical piano when he was 5 years old. At the conservatory, he studied harmony, counterpoint, the fugue and orchestral leading. He won first prize in piano and moved onto Paris where he became a salesman, working in a music store which by chance imported synthesizers, at a time when nobody has sold such before.

He became interested in those electronic instruments and took the stage (Theatre des Champs Elysées – Paris) solo, surrounded by all his synthesizers (Bionic Orchestra, 1979).

Rimbert met another proponent of the synthesizer: Jean-Michel Jarre, through a mutual friend Michel Geiss, in 1979 at Jarre's concert in Place de La Concorde, Paris. Since the 1986 Rendez-vous Houston concert, Rimbert has been at Jarre's side on stage.

Aside from his work on various albums for Jarre, Rimbert has created several works of sonic illustration and has won first prize at the international festival of electronic music in Tokyo in 1988 (chaired by Isao Tomita).

In 1994, Rimbert created music for some video games.

In 2003, Rimbert released a new album, entitled Double Face. Gaelick is an homage to Michael Flatley (Lord of the Dance (musical)) and the lightness of the Irish dance.

In 2005, American distributor Atomic Quill Music signed a distribution contract and 10,000 units of Double Face were pressed. Rimbert performed a showcase during the Fuse-In festival in Detroit and held a release party at Record Time, a Detroit shop of electronic music. Various titles were remixed by American Djs, including Kenneth Thomas and D:Fuse and distributed by Moist Music.

During September 2005, Double Face was released in France and throughout Europe. In November, Rimbert held a showcase at Le Divan de Monde, in Paris.

In 2006, Francis signed distribution contracts in Scandinavia and with digital distributor Wild Palms Music. A single, Mecanique du Temps, a duet with his friend and hard rock guitarist Patrick Rondat, was released as a limited edition to coincide with a performance at Salon de la Musique in September. A compilation: Sound of Vintage Volume 1 followed.

March 2007 saw the release of Sound of Vintage Volume 2, followed by Snap Shots in October. During 2007, Rimbert and his band performed live concerts featuring some of the titles of this record. In these concerts he has shared the stage with LOL, and his friend Sylvain Durand. Also on board are a percussionist Victor Paillet, sound designer Nicolas Mills and singer Angy.

Invited by his distributors, first in Spain and then the Netherlands before taking on the rest of Europe, Francis pursued a promotional tour and performed a concert in Lyon in November 2007, to benefit Handicap International.

During 2008, Francis toured with Jean-Michel Jarre, performing the full Oxygene suite in several European cities. During 2009 and 2010, he has toured again, this time in the IN<>DOORS and 2010 tours of Jarre.

== Live concerts ==
- 21 June 2007 in Suresnes, France - outdoor concert
- 23 June 2007 in Croissy-sur-Seine, France - outdoor concert (2500 people attended this live concert)
- 16 November 2007 in Lyon, France - indoor charity concert for Handicap International. A DVD of this concert was released in 2008.

== Discography ==
1979; Bionic Orchestra (Synthesizer); 01. La Comete (3:51); 02. Voices of paradise (3:29); 03. The last day (5:10); 04. Eire (3:26); 05. Games (3:57); 06. Bionic (4:36); 07. Flying away (5:55)	1980; Sponsor Spots (featuring Jean Pierre Savelli); 01. Sponsor 1 (3:56); 02. Sponsor 2 (3:41); 03. Sponsor 3 (3:36); 04. Sponsor 4 (4:27); 05. Sponsor 5 (1:52); 06. Sponsor 6 (6:24); 07. Sponsor 7 (2:45); 08. Sponsor 8 (5:02); 09. Sponsor 9 (3:03)	1980; Synthesizer (April Orchestra 36); 01. Gift for you (3:35); 02. L'Arlequin – part 1 (2:07); 03. L'Arlequin – part 2 (3:12); 04. Eire (3:15); 05. Vocoderman (3:10) Daniel Borreau; 06. Voices of paradise (3:15); 07. Space in velum (3:50); 08. Loco-Motif (3:50); 09. Games (3:40); 10. Old flipper reggae (3:40); 11. Comete (3:30); 12. The last day (4:55); 13. Bionic (4:20)	1980; Passing Shot; 01. Smash (4:16); 02. Transat (3:35); 03. Dreams (2:53); 04. Benzon's way (4:35); 05. Spleen (2:37); 06. Free Space (3:30); 07. Passing Shot (3:44); 08. Shimes (3:10); 09. Sensitive (3:46); 10. Lovely (2:50); 11. Pictures (3:15); 12. Crazy melody (3:43)

1982; Duty Free (April Orchestra 45) (featuring Jean Pierre Savelli); 01. Retro building (3:12); 02. Danse des ordinateurs (3:48); 03. Terre de jade (3:38); 04. Marcory love (3:46); 05. Coeur sur glace (3:32); 06. Sucre d'orge blues (3:31); 07. Studio campus (3:40); 08. Fabrienne song (3:07); 09. Séquence des ondes (4:00); 10. Aventure non-stop (3:34); 11. Bandama story (2:20); 12. Piano sue l'herbe (3:13)	1982; FR2 (April Orchestra 48) (featuring Frederick Rousseau); 01. Overture Mob (3:22); 02. L 'attache Coeur (3:18); 03. Le Lutin Oméga (2:20); 04. Création Alfa (2:33); 05. Quai de L'Enigme (4:28); 06. Stress Delta (2:06); 07. Matinée de Lune (4:30); 08. Piano Crash (2:54); 09. African Délirium (3:05); 10. Marguerite Degarne (3:00); 11. Top Machin (2:37); 12. Computer Study (2:30); 13. Trafic à L.A. (3:13); 14. First Emotion (3:02); 15. Last Spot (2:00); 16. Pontault-Combault (3:05)	1983; Synthesizer II (April Orchestra 51); 01. Olympus one (3:01); 02. Le vent par la fenêtre (4:42); 03. L'eau lourde (4:04); 04. Les grands horizons (4:24); 05. Samba Diba (2:53); 06. 100% de risques (2:30); 07. L'oiseau lyre (2:15); 08. Robot Alpha (3:07); 09. Le gagnant (3:13); 10. Le tounois (2:59); 11. Armaguedon (3:12); 12. La Colombienne (3:16); 13. Petite Maud (2:56); 14. L'automate (3:20); 15. Ballade à Gemenos (3:30); 16. Industrie 2002 (2:51)	1984; Synthesizer III Gym-music (April Orchestra 54); 01. Jany Jog (4:15); 02. Happy Jog (4:37); 03. Atomic Jog (3:28); 04. Dancing Time (3:10); 05. Jenny Generic (3:32); 06. La Nuit de l'Oiseau (4:40); 07. So Funky Break (3:25); 08. Jogging Bahia (3:27); 09. Lady Gym (5:44); 10. Joker Break (3:24); 11. Body Beguine (3:42); 12. Lilyan's Melody (3:52)

1984; Compilation jingles (April Orchestra 56); 01. Rocking Chair (2:48); J. Kinegan / Izanelli; 02. Le Manege de Lucifer (3:14); 03. Fish Race (3:28); F. Talgom; 04. Mes Parents (3:14); R. Passero / Ch. Ducolombier; 05. Petite (3:14); R. Passero / Ch. Ducolombier; 06. Francesco Folies (2:48); 07. E344(+) (2:48); J. Kinegan / Izanelli; 08. Various Jingles (3:14); L. Attard	1986; Synthesizer IV Electric Feeling (April Orchestra 64); 01. La Dame de Coeur (5:26); 02. Mister Giorgetti (3:45); 03. Cool Max (3:32); 04. La Fille du Moulin (6:56); 05. B comme Cayenne (2:37); 06. Le sens des saisons (3:31); 07. La course du cerf (2:50); 08. Industrie Industrie (3:17); 09. 77 blues (3:45); 10. Pour l'Irlande (3:09); 11. Amandine R. (4:10); 12. Les mots secrets / Honey Tears (3:33); 13. Cinémas d'autrefois (3:25)	1987; Keyboard Songs (Music for Media); 01. Keyboard Song (3:54); 02. Les Portes d'Atlantide (3:36); 03. Up to Rio (3:35); 04. Last Driver (3:18); 05. Les Années Carosse (3:00); 06. Miniko (3:21); 07. AL (3:07); 08. Magnetic Circus (3:18); 09. La 13e Enigme (2:48); 10. Jumping Roller (3:40); 11. Sad Monday (3:59); 12. Le Regard d'Amandine (3:03)	1988; Digital Faith (Music for Media); 01. Piste Noire (4:08); 02. Goeland (2:26); 03. Légendes de Boissy (2:50); 04. Sacre Matt (3:05); 05. Salon Christa (3:39); 06. Space Hammer (2:57); 07. Aurore et l'oiseau (3:39); 08. Truckers (3:14); 09. Annie Malices (2:57); 10. Le Temps des machines(3:22); 11. Neige (3:56); 12. Entrecha-cha (3:53); 13. La dame de Croissy (3:56); 14. New adventures (4:12); 15. Étrange historie (3:20); 16. Le loup (2:37)

1990; A.L.I.V.E; 01. Le Loup (1:41); 02. Frantic (2:42) Ennio Morricone; 03. Arlequin (3:01); 04. Kiss (2:45) - Square; 05. 100% de Risque (2:44); 06. Blade Runner (4:04) Vangelis; 07. Water Music (4:06) Händel; 08. Belmondo Medley (5:20) Ennio Morricone; 09. Cayenne (3:08); 10. Honey Tears (3:23); 11. Jean Michel Jarre Medley (8:11) Jean Michel Jarre; 12. Entrecha-cha (3:53); 13. Crazy Song (2:06) Francis Rimbert/J. Brown/P. Duhteil	1991; Scenario; 01. Infogram (2:31); 02. Saxy Boy (2:37); 03. Michele H. (3:28); 04. Deauville (3:42); 05. Silicium (3:43); 06. Atlantide (3:36); 07. Speedway (3:21); 08. Showcase (3:18); 09. Arlequin (4:08); 10. Northern Lights (2:58); 11. Trailing (3:16); 12. Leather (3:18); 13. Isabelita (3:49); 14. Walking Blues (3:57); 15. Exotic Sherif (3:03); 16. Penguin March (3:00)	2005; Double Face (studio album); 01. Devil Soul (4:03); 02. The Wave (5:06); 03. Gaelick (4:06); 04. What Is Love (3:20); 05. French Kiss (4:23); 06. Across The Fogg (4:02); 07. Woodoo (5:33); 08. Dorian Gray (3:22); 09. Elfe's Race (5:00); 10. Women's Land (5:33); 11. Adagio (4:40); 12. Strange Spirit (4:24)

2006; Mecanique du Temps (maxi CD) (featuring Patrick Rondat); 01. Mecanique Du Temps (3:41); 02. Woodoo (5:33); 03. Dorian Gray (3:22); 04. Across The Fog (4:02)	2006; Sound of Vintage - volume 1 (compilation 1983, 84 & 86); 01. Happy Jog (4:41); 02. Mister Giorgetti (3:41); 03. Le Gagnant (3:10); 04. Cool Max (3:29); 05. Petite Maud (2:52); 06. Sweety Journey (3:26); 07. So Funky Break (3:27); 08. Les Mots Secrets (3:27); 09. Pour L’Irlande (3:03); 10. Robot Alpha (3:04); 11. Sens Des Saisons (3:29); 12. Olympus One (3:00); 13. La Dame De Coeur (5:25); 14. 100% De Risque (3:24); 15. Jenny Generic (3:24); Bonus Track: Lonely (8:21)	2007; Sound of Vintage - volume 2 (compilation 1983, 84 & 86); 01. Le Tournois (2:44); 02. B Comme Cayenne (3:23); 03. 77 Blues (3:33); 04. La Nuit De L’Oiseau (4:39); 05. L’Eau Lourde (3:55); 06. L’Automate (3:13); 07. Le Cinema D’Autrefois (3:17); 08. Atomic Jog (3:26); 09. L’Oiseau Lyre (2:04); 10. Amandine R. (3:58); 11. Lilyan's Melody (3:50); 12. La Fille Du Moulin (3:13); 13. Industrie 2002 (2:40); 14. Jany Jog (4:11); 15. Lady Gym (5:43); Bonus Track: A Simple Story (3:38)	2007; Snap Shots (studio album); 01. Dawn of Light (5:10); 02. Victory (4:33); 03. Hidden Movie (3:26); 04. Somewhere in July (3:54); 05. Viva La Revolucion (3:21); 06. Twin Dam Do (4:12); 07. Memory of Love (4:06); 08. Apocalypse (4:39); 09. Mecanique du Temps (3:41); 10. Sleeping Beauty (4:02); 11. R.B.F (4:11)

Francis Rimbert CD-ROM soundtracks
1994

Payuta
(Ubisoft CD-ROM soundtrack)

1996

TIM 7
(Ubisoft CD-ROM soundtrack)
