= Bruno Rossignol =

French conductor and composer

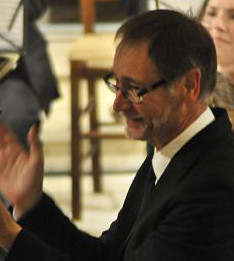
- Born: 1958 (age 67–68); Nanterre, France
- Education: École Normale de Musique de Paris; Sorbonne
- Occupations: Composer; Pianist; Choral director; Music educator
- Awards: Grand prix de Hauts-de-Seine (1996); Médaille de la Ville de Paris (1990)

Bruno Rossignol (born 1958 in Nanterre) is a French composer, choral conductor and conductor, pianist and music educator.

== Biography ==
He studied music at the École normale de musique de Paris and the Sorbonne. He then directed choirs: first trainee conductor at the Paris Opera and at the choir of the Orchestre de Paris (by Jean Laforge and Arthur Oldham), he was then founding conductor of the Île-de-France Chamber Choir. (first prize of the International competitions of Malta in 1989 and Verona in 1993). With this ensemble, he received the Grand Prix des Hauts-de-Seine in 1996.

From 1985 to 1995, he was the choir conductor of the musical shows of Jean-Michel Jarre, whom he accompanied in London, Paris-La Défense (1990), Berlin, Budapest, Seville, Barcelona, Santiago de Compostela, Mont-Saint-Michel.

He was director of the Conservatories of Jouy-en-Josas from 1989 to 1992, Suresnes from 1992 to 1997, Orsay from 1997 to 2000, Bourges from 2000 to 2005 and Hector Berlioz in Paris 10th from 2005 to 2010. He conducted the adult choir of the Paul Dukas conservatory in Paris 12th from 2006 to 2010.

In 2011, he was appointed director of the Conservatoire à rayonnement départemental (CRD) de la Dordogne and artistic director of the Dordogne instrumental ensemble. (E.I.D.) with which he performs mainly in the regions Aquitaine. At the same time he creates the Dordogne choir which becomes the Paratge choir in 2016. He joined Paris that same year to take over the direction of the Jean-Philippe Rameau conservatory (6th arrondissement of Paris).

== Works ==
Bruno Rossignol composes choral works such as Ave verum, Exurgens autem Maria and Salve Regina pour un tombeau de Francis Poulenc. He mainly writes a large number of instrumental pieces (Le Roi des grenouilles, Les Nouvelles Histoires Naturelles and Curieuses rencontres) through which he expresses his vocation as a teacher.

Cantata :

- L'escalier (2007), choir with four mixed voices.

Concertos:

- Concerto pour harpe, premiered in 2008 by Sabine Chefson
- Concerto pour violon, premiered in 2000 by Annie Jodry.

Mélodies:

- Les nouvelles histoires naturelles for soprano, baritone and piano, on texts by Jules Renard.

Chamber music:

- Aria (1995), violin and piano
- Au père lapin (1997), trumpet and piano
- Ballade irlandaise (1988), flute and piano
- Carillon (2008), horn and piano
- Danse des sylphes (1988), flute and piano
- Danse du paon, horn and piano
- Défilé (2012), trombone and piano
- Divertissement (1995), three flutes
- Élégie (1984), oboe and piano
- Interlude maya, viola and guitar
- Jazz notes violon 2 with Alexandre Tenaud, (1992), violin and piano
- Jean-Paul's march (2000), horn and piano
- La jument grise, percussion and piano
- La meunière a neuf écus (2014), violin and piano.
- Le sentier des sources, Celtic harp
- Le songe d'Hector (2007), oboe and piano
- Le violon en herbe (1995), violin and piano
- Loup yétu (2012), violin and piano
- Manège, saxophone and piano
- Novelettes (2000): Au clair de la terre, Mélodie irlandaise and Promenade romantique, three pieces for cello and piano
- Ode rose (2008), clarinet and piano
- Orphée et Calupan (2010), pieces with four hands and six hands
- Pavane en deux tons (1984), horn and piano
- Rag (2008), oboe and piano
- Ravel blues (1988), violin and piano
- Rhapsodie-jeu (1994), saxophone and piano
- Saudade (2002), violin and piano
- Suite (1996), flute, clarinet and piano
- Trois bagatelles (2005), obie, cello and piano
- Trois pièces (2006), percussions
- Trois toiles pour rêver, three clarinets

Music for choir:

- Ave verum (2005)
- Dona nobis pacem (2015)
- Exsurgens autem Maria (premiered in May 2014 as part of the 900th anniversary celebrations of the Pontigny Abbey)
- De la mer... (1994), female four-voice choir
- Demain (1999)
- L’A.B.C. d’un chœur (1997)
- La mer est entrée dans les prés (2016)
- Louange (1994), female four-voice choir
- Que tu es belle ! (1994), female four-voice choir
- Risotto musicale - Trois registres parlando (2004)
- Salve Regina - pour un tombeau de Francis Poulenc (1998)
- Stabat Mater (1999)

Music for soloist:

- Cilaos (2000), harp
- Curieuses rencontres (1985): Le petit garçon qui marchait sur la lune, Au clair de la terre, La planète où dansent les fourmis bleues, L'astéroïde B 612 et Les étoiles, five pieces for piano
- En Bretagne (1996), piano
- In memoriam J.M.R. (2004), saxophone
- Le roi des grenouilles (1993), five piano pieces, based on Grimm's fairy tale
- Mouvements perpétuels (2013), piano
- Paysages en coin (2004), piano
- Philémon (2012), horn
- Quel cirque (1991), piano
- Reflet orange et reflet bleu, Celtic harp
- Soirées sous la lune (2008), guitar
- Valse chagrine (1988), clarinet
- Valse tendre et aristocratique (2001), piano.

Opera:

- Madame Roland, created in Suresnes as part of the bicentenary events of the Revolution.

Oratorio:

- La fin dau monde, (premiered on 26 and 27 April 2013 respectively in Sarlat and Boulazac (Périgueux) écrit en Limousin dialect after a text by Jean-Yves Agard, docteur en sociologie, défenseur des langues régionales.

He has also transcribed for piano four hands great works from the repertoire:

- Pictures at an Exhibition by Moussorgski
- Prélude à l'après-midi d'un faune by Debussy
- Un bal, extract of the Symphonie fantastique by Berlioz, editions Delatour.

== Honours ==
As a choral conductor, he won:

- First prize of the Malta International Competition in 1989
- First prize of the International Verona Competition (Italy) in 1993.
- Award for the best conductor of the Verona Festival 1993
- Grand prix de Hauts-de-Seine in 1996.
- The Médaille de la Ville de Paris in 1990
