= Radiophonie Vol. 16 =

Soundtrack album by Jean-Michel Jarre
- Released: 6 November 2026
- Recorded: 2021
- Genres: Electronic, soundtrack, jingle
- Length: 39:35
- Label: Radio France Signature
- Producer: Jean-Michel Jarre

Jean-Michel Jarre chronology
Oxymoreworks (2023)	Radiophonie Vol. 16 (2026)

Radiophonie Vol. 16 is a soundtrack album by the French electronic musician and composer Jean-Michel Jarre for the French news network France Info released on 6 November 2026. The soundtrack is titled Polygone and compliments the Polygone tracks that were released on Radiophonie Vol. 12. Two of the tracks on Vol. 12 can also be found on Vol. 16: Polygone 20 and Polygone 21. The first track is a 2021 Remix of a previously released track called Hexagone Theme 1, which can be found on earlier Radiophonie albums Radiophonie Vol. 9 and Radiophonie Vol. 10. The album was sold exclusively at the French retail chain Fnac.
