= Roland XP-80 =

Music workstation

XP-80
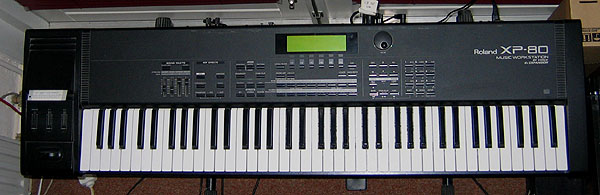
- Roland XP-80 Workstation
- Manufacturer: Roland Corporation
- Dates: 1996

Technical specifications
- Polyphony: 64 voices
- Timbrality: 16-part
- Oscillator: 4 Osc. per voice
- Synthesis type: PCM-Subtractive using 8MB of PCM chip-ROM (decompressed to 16MB)
- Storage memory: 512 Preset, 128 User-patches; 64 Preset, 32 User-performances
- Effects: Reverb, Chorus, Delay (8 types); 40 effects (EFX)

Input/output
- Keyboard: 76 semi-weighted keys (velocity and aftertouch sensitive)
- Left-hand control: 4 controller-pedals, 6 control-sliders
- External control: On-board sequencer, Arpeggiator, 4 slots for expansion boards (8 MB each)

The Roland XP-80 is a music workstation that uses digital PCM subtractive synthesis and combines an updated version of the JV-1080 synthesizer engine with the sequencer capabilities of the Roland MRC-Pro sequencer. The XP-80 was introduced in 1996 and is now discontinued.

== Specifications ==
The XP-80 has a 76-key semi-weighted keyboard. A smaller 61-key variant, the XP-60 was introduced shortly afterward. The synthesis engine is capable of 64-voice polyphony and 16-part multi-timbrality. The XP-80 includes the 128 General MIDI instrument set, as well as 384 additional preset instruments ("patches" in Roland parlance), for a total of 512 preset patches. Additional user memory is provided for making copies of up to 128 patches, allowing the user to edit patch parameters and save them in memory. There are 8 preset percussion instrument combinations (called "rhythm sets") and 2 user configurable rhythm sets. The XP-80 includes 64 preset combinations of up to 15 existing patches and 1 rhythm set. These patch and rhythm set combinations are referred to as "performances" in Roland parlance. There are an additional 32 user memory locations to store user configurable performances. There is a built-in backlit LCD of 320 by 80 pixels.

The onboard sequencer is capable of storing up to 60,000 notes of recorded musical performance and has a clock resolution of 96 parts per quarter note. It's capable of storing up to 100 patterns and 1 song at a time in memory, but can also load and play music sequences directly from floppy disk using the built-in floppy disk drive.

The XP-80 includes 4 user accessible expansion slots (located under a removable cover on the bottom of the unit). Each slot can accommodate one SR-JV80 expansion board. A total of 21 SR-JV80 expansion boards were released by Roland. Nineteen were sold (SR-JV80-01 through SR-JV80-19), while 2 were given away as demonstration expansion boards for various promotions (SR-JV80-98 and SR-JV80-99).

A built-in 3.5" floppy disk drive provides removable data storage for up to 1.44 MB of music sequences, sequence chain-play playlists, groove quantize settings, additional patch, rhythm set, performance and system settings storage.

External connections include 2 unbalanced 1/4-inch "MIX" (left and right channel) and 2 unbalanced "DIRECT" (left and right channel) TS connector jacks. Sounds are normally routed to the MIX outputs but can instead be routed to the DIRECT outputs when required. There is a 1/4-inch stereo headphone jack, a 1/4-inch jack for the sustain (hold) pedal and a 1/4-inch jack for sequencer click output, useful as a metronome when playing along with the sequencer. Four 1/4-inch control pedal jacks have configurable functions, including the ability to adjust patch volume, patch cutoff frequency, effects levels, organ speaker rotation simulation, stepping through patches, and so forth. There are three 5-pin MIDI ports (IN, OUT, and THRU).

The waveforms and presets of the XP-80 are made by sound designer Eric Persing.

This product is no longer in production. Similar capabilities can be found in newer Roland Fantom series music workstations.

== Trivia ==
The Roland XP-80 has been used by Jean Michel Jarre to record his Sessions 2000 and by Michael Jackson.

Jimmy Jam and Terry Lewis used the Roland XP-60 on Janet Jackson's album All for You, creating the song "China Love" exclusively with it.

The Roland XP-80 was used live in the 1990s by famous Moldovan musician Mihai Dolgan and his band Noroc.

Also utilised by Flaming Lips on their album 'Yoshimi battles the Pink Robots' ' and by keyboardist Venturieri in Belém-PA, Brazil.

== XP series ==
Its family of XP synthesizers consists of the first released XP-10 in 1994 and XP-50 in 1995. Later joined by the XP-80 in 1996 and the XP-60 in 1998 and lastly the XP-30 in 1999.

== See also ==
- Roland JV-1080
- Roland JV-2080
