= Pleasure principle =

Pleasure Principle may refer to:

- Pleasure principle (psychology), a psychoanalytical term coined by Sigmund Freud
- Pleasure Principle (fashion), a New York-based fashion label designed by Diva Pittala and Adrian Cowen
- Pleasure Principle (album), a 1978 album by Parlet
- The Pleasure Principle, a 1986 album by Treat
- The Pleasure Principle (album), a 1979 album by Gary Numan
- "The Pleasure Principle" (song), a 1987 single by Janet Jackson
- The Pleasure Principle (film), a 1991 film starring Peter Firth
- The Pleasure Principle (TV series), a 2019 TV-series, co-produced by Poland, Czechia and Ukraine (Zasada przyjemności, Princip slasti, Принцип насолоди)
- "Pleasure Principle", a song from Jean Michel Jarre's 2003 album Geometry of Love
- "Pleasure Principle", the final part of the song Impossible Soul by Sufjan Stevens from the album The Age of Adz
- The Pleasure Principle (Le Principe du Plaisir), a painting by René Magritte
