= Radiophonie Vol. 12 =

Soundtrack album by Jean-Michel Jarre
- Released: 11 February 2022
- Recorded: 2016, 2021
- Genres: Electronic, soundtrack, jingle
- Length: 32:16
- Label: Radio France Signature
- Producer: Jean-Michel Jarre

Jean-Michel Jarre chronology
Amazônia (2021)	Radiophonie Vol. 12 (2022)	Oxymore (2022)

Radiophonie Vol. 12 is a soundtrack album by the French electronic musician and composer Jean-Michel Jarre for the French news network France Info released on 11 February 2022. The soundtrack is titled Polygone. The album also contains some Hexagone tracks, which are part of the Hexagone series also found on Radiophonie Vol. 9 and Radiophonie Vol. 10. The album was sold exclusively at the French retail chain Fnac.

== Charts ==
Chart performance for Radiophonie Vol. 12
Chart (2022)	Peak position
Belgian Albums (Ultratop Flanders)	59
