= Roland XP-30 =

Synthesizer

XP-30
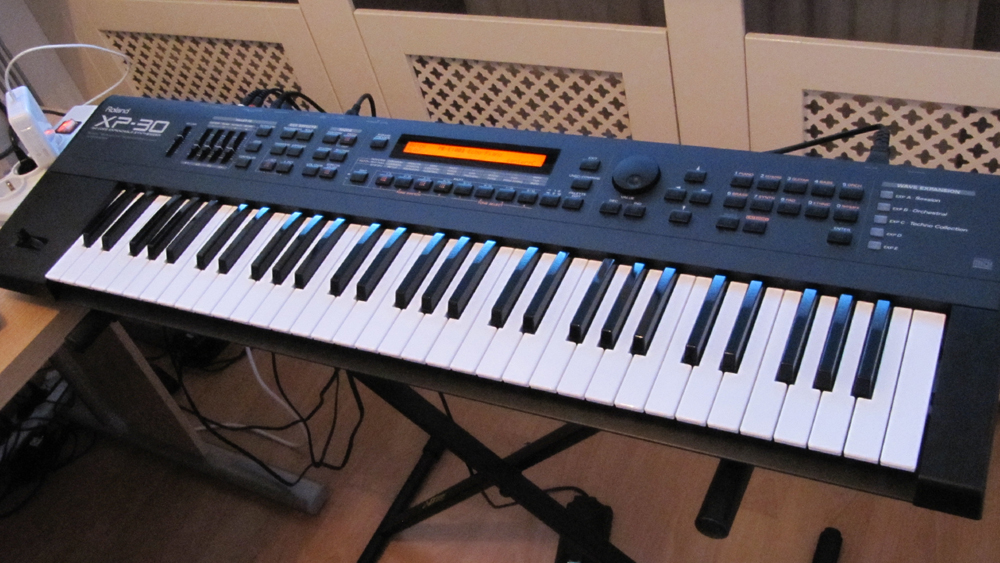
- Roland XP-30 synthesizer
- Manufacturer: Roland Corporation
- Dates: 1999 – 2002
- Price: £999 GBP €1499 EUR

Technical specifications
- Polyphony: 64 voices
- Timbrality: 16-part
- Oscillator: 4 per voice
- LFO: 2 MIDI syncable LFOs
- Synthesis type: Sample-based synthesis
- Filter: TVF (low pass, band, high pass, peak pass)
- Attenuator: P-EG, F-EG, A-EG
- Aftertouch expression: Yes, channel
- Velocity expression: Yes
- Storage memory: 1406 patches
- Effects: 40 effect types Reverb (8 types); Chorus

Input/output
- Keyboard: 61 keys
- Left-hand control: Pitch bend with modulation
- External control: MIDI In, out and thru, pedal sustain / switch

The Roland XP-30 is a 61-key, 64-voice expandable synthesizer. Released in 1999, it was produced until 2002. Based on the JV-2080 sound engine built around a 32-bit RISC processor, it is considered to be the best value-for-money of all of the Roland JV and XP series synthesizers.

== Features and architecture ==
Designed for live performance, the XP-30 is relatively small and lightweight but with full-sized keys and a large set of sounds (2078 when fully expanded). The keyboard is semi-weighted, with a metal weight glued under each key in order to improve key press dynamics. The XP-30 also includes a powerful arpeggiator with multiple patterns that can be timed by an external MIDI clock (such as a sequencer or drum machine) and nine built-in drum kits. The XP-30 provides expansion capability in the form of two physical slots for adding cards from Roland's SR-JV80 expansion card series.

Some other hardware features include:

- There are 4 sliders on the XP-30 which control envelope settings, tone volumes, and 4 user-assignable parameters.
- To Host connection for hooking the device up to a computer. This is mainly used as an alternative for a MIDI interface.
- 40-character, 2-line backlit LCD.
- Large dial for selecting sounds.
- I/O Connections: Output (L/Mono, R), Phones, MIDI (In, Out, Thru), Computer interface (Mac/PC1/PC2), Control pedal, Hold pedal.

== Sound banks ==
The XP-30 comes with 640 patches in its preset banks plus 766 additional patches available through three integrated SR-JV80 sound expansion ROM sets: Session (SR-JV80-09), Orchestral (SR-JV80-02) and Techno Collection (SR-JV80-11). This provided a total of 1,406 patches for the XP-30, as configured from the factory. Since the XP-30 has two additional SR-JV80 board ports, the XP-30 can be further expanded by the user with the patches and wave forms from any of the compatible boards from the SR-JV80 series.

The sound banks are organized as follows:

- Presets A, B, C, E: Roland's own patches, many of which were created by sound programmer Spectrasonics founder Eric Persing. All of these banks include 128 patches and 32 performances. ("Performance" here means patch combinations, in a structure similar to what Korg and other companies may refer to as Program or Combi modes.)
- Preset D is a General MIDI set.
- Expansion banks A, B, C each provide 256 patches that use the same ROM data from the Session, Techno and Orchestral cards, only integrated into the motherboard circuitry as opposed to being discrete expansion boards.
- Expansion Banks D and E are reserved for two SR-JV80 series boards. The number of available patches and wave forms varies among boards in this series.
- User bank includes 128 patch and 32 performance banks where users can store patches created from scratch or edited from the factory presets.
- 26 factory rhythm sets

A Smart Media card slot on the back of the XP-30 allowed for significantly increasing user memory capacity, although that added memory space is not instantly accessible as with older Roland-proprietary RAM/ROM cards. The user must manually load a .SVD format file from card to the user memory bank first, then recall the data stored on the memory card. This can be done from the XP-30 front panel but direct and instant access to card data is not possible as it was with, for example the proprietary RAM and ROM cards that could be used with the JV-1080, JD-990 and other earlier Roland synthesizers. Despite the comparably large memory capacity (e.g., a 4MB card can store 59 .SVD files, or essentially a 128-patch bank), the XP-30 was compatible only with 5-volt Smart Media cards, which were produced in far lower volume—and lower capacities—than the longer-lived 3.3-volt (or often referred to as "3V") card format. The XP-30 supports only the 5-volt variety of Smart Media.

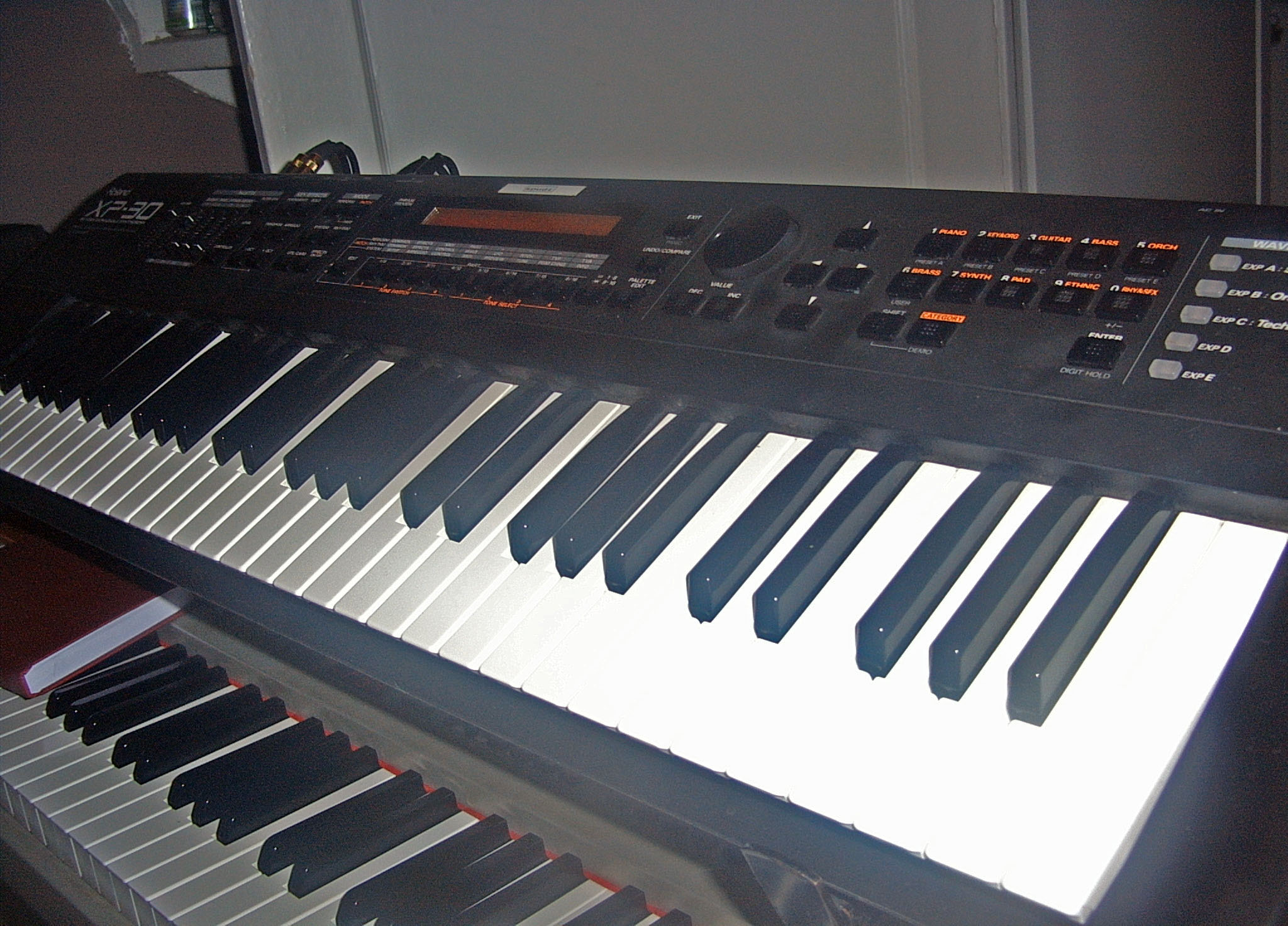
Roland XP-30 synthesizer

== XP series ==
Roland's XP family of synthesizers began with the release of the XP-10 in 1994. This was followed by the XP-50 in 1995. These were later joined by the XP-80 and XP-60 in 1996 and finally the XP-30 in 1999.
