= Geometry of Love =

Studio album by Jean-Michel Jarre
- Released: October 2003
- Genres: Electronica; lounge; ambient
- Length: 42:13
- Label: Warner Music
- Producer: Jean Michel Jarre

Jean-Michel Jarre chronology
Sessions 2000 (2002)	Geometry of Love (2003)	AERO (2004)

Geometry of Love is the fifteenth studio album by French electronic musician and composer Jean-Michel Jarre, released by Warner Music in October 2003.

This album has more in common with the preceding Sessions 2000 album than releases prior, but the style here is still more electronica than jazz. The music was to be lounge music, played in the background or in the chill-out area of a club. The album was commissioned by Jean-Roch, as a soundtrack for his 'VIP Room' nightclub in France. The CD was initially meant to come out in only 2000 copies. However, it was later released as a generally available CD. The physical CD was a long time out of print (available only in digital download format), but in 2018 remastered reissue was released on CD again.

The album cover is a pixelated and turned counter-clockwise photo of the pubis of Isabelle Adjani, Jarre's girlfriend at the time.

The track "Velvet Road" is a remake of the unreleased composition "Children of Space" created by Jarre for the "Rendez-Vous in Space" concert in Okinawa, in 2001. Some of the sounds in Geometry of Love were used earlier on Interior Music released in 2001. Several tracks from Geometry of Love were included on Jarre's 2006 compilation release Sublime Mix.

== Track listing ==
All tracks are written by Jean-Michel Jarre.

No.	Title	Length
1.	"Pleasure Principle"	6:15
2.	"Geometry of Love Part 1"	3:51
3.	"Soul Intrusion"	4:45
4.	"Electric Flesh"	6:01
5.	"Skin Paradox"	6:17
6.	"Velvet Road"	5:54
7.	"Near Djaina"	5:01
8.	"Geometry of Love Part 2"	4:06

== Equipment ==
- Roland XP-80
- Eminent 310U
- ARP 2600
- Minimoog
- Korg KARMA
- Novation Digital Music Systems Supernova II
- microKORG
- Roland JP-8000
- Korg Mini Pops 7
- Digisequencer
- E-mu Systems XL7
- Roland HandSonic
- EMS Synthi AKS
- EMS VCS 3
- RMI Harmonic Synthesizer
- Pro Tools
