= Roland JV-2080 =

Synthesizer

JV-2080
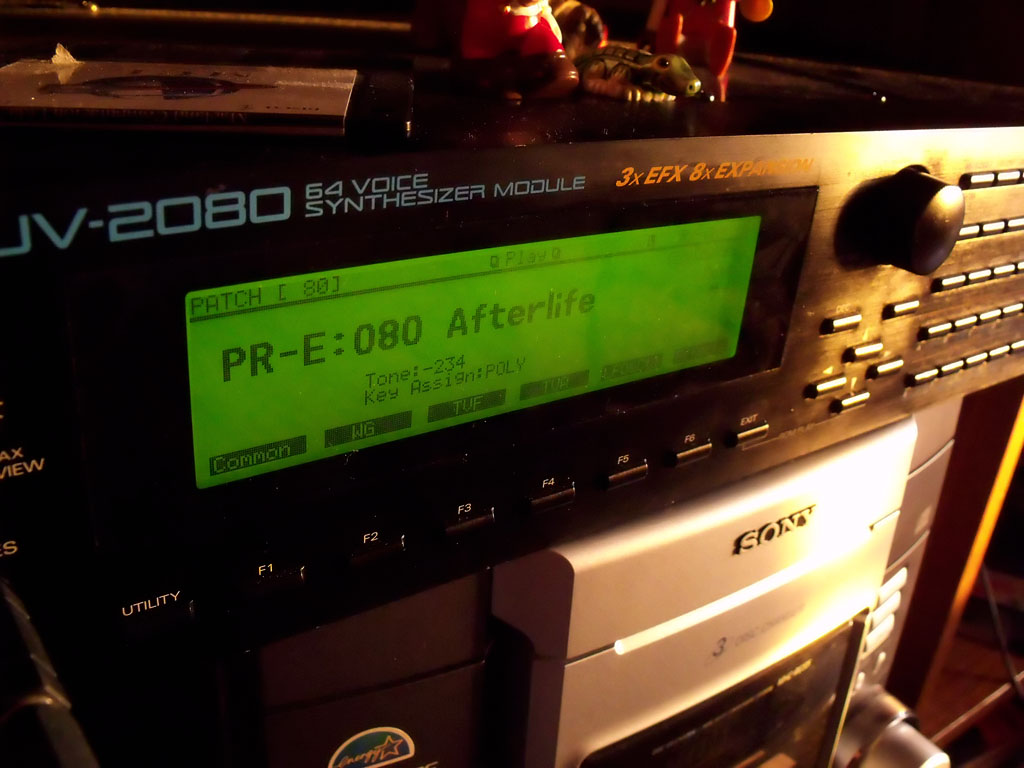
- A close up of the lit screen
- Manufacturer: Roland
- Dates: 1997–2000
- Price: 1399 UKP

Technical specifications
- Polyphony: 64 tones
- Timbrality: 16 part multitimbral
- Oscillator: 4 tones per voice
- LFO: 2 per tone, with eight waveforms
- Synthesis type: Sample based
- Filter: 1 TVF (Time Variant Filter) per tone, with resonance and its own envelope. 4 filter types (LPF, BPF, HPF, Peaking)
- Attenuator: 1 TVA (Time Variant Amplifier) per tone
- Aftertouch expression: Channel and Polyphonic
- Velocity expression: Initial and release. Editable crossfade and key range
- Storage memory: Patches: 1 USER bank of 128 (RAM) + 4 PRESET banks of 128 (ROM) + 1 General MIDI bank of 128 (ROM). 768 total.; Rhythm Sets: 1 USER bank of 2 + 4 PRESET banks of 2 + 1 GM bank of 2. 12 total.; Performances: 1 USER bank of 32 + 2 PRESET banks of 32. 96 total.; Optional 8 ROM expansion slots and 1 RAM card slot.

Input/output
- External control: MIDI (in/out/thru)

The Roland JV-2080 is a rack-mount expandable MIDI sound module and an updated version of the Roland JV-1080. Produced by the Roland Corporation, released in early 1997, and built on a sample-based synthesis architecture, the JV-2080 provides a library of on-board sample material and a semi-modular synthesis engine.

== Main features ==
The JV-2080 ("2080") is a sample + synthesis synthesizer with support for 768 internal patches, including General MIDI. In addition to the synthesizer, it also includes a multi-effects module, with 40 effect types, of which three can be used simultaneously. The 2080 is expandable via proprietary modules that contain both sample-based waveform data and patch information. The internal memory of the 2080 is divided into five sections.

- USER – User re-writeable storage (RAM), initially contains a modified copy of PR-E.
- PR-A, B, C, E (Preset A through C and E) – Presets in read-only memory, cannot be modified.
- PR-D (General MIDI) – Presets compatible with the General MIDI system.
- XP-A through H (Expansion A through H) – Patches and Rhythm Sets from expansion boards, installed in slots A through H.
- CARD – Data from compatible memory cards and sound library cards (PN-JV80 series).

The JV-2080 can also be 'stacked' with up to eight units ganged together to increase polyphony to achieve a 512 voice multitimbral performance.

== On-board demos ==
The JV-2080 has three on-board demo songs. The demos are:

- "Timepeace", by Scott Tibbs.
- "Denki", by Ryeland Allison.
- "Short Cuts", by Yuuki Kato. Directed by Takayuki Nagatani.

== Factory sounds ==
The core sampled waveforms of the JV-2080 were developed by Roland R&D-LA in Culver City, California. Some of the factory presets and expansion board sounds were created by Eric Persing of Spectrasonics and Ace Yukawa.

== Expansion ==
In common with other Roland instruments, the JV-2080 could be expanded with SR-JV80 expansion boards, and could accept up to eight of them at a time.

=== Expansion cards ===
- SR-JV80-01: Pop
- SR-JV80-02: Orchestral
- SR-JV80-03: Piano
- SR-JV80-04: Vintage Synth
- SR-JV80-05: World
- SR-JV80-06: Dance*
- SR-JV80-07: Super Sound Set
- SR-JV80-08: Keyboards of the 60s & 70s
- SR-JV80-09: Session
- SR-JV80-10: Bass and Drums
- SR-JV80-11: Techno
- SR-JV80-12: Hip-Hop
- SR-JV80-13: Vocal
- SR-JV80-14: Asia
- SR-JV80-15: Special FX
- SR-JV80-16: Orchestral II
- SR-JV80-17: Country
- SR-JV80-18: Latin World
- SR-JV80-19: House
- SR-JV80-97: Experience III
- SR-JV80-98: Experience II
- SR-JV80-99: Experience

Notice: Due to copyright problems Roland no longer distributes the Dance expansion board.

== Notable users and genres ==
Artists and producers from a broad range of genres utilize the JV-1080 and JV-2080. In 2001, synthpop artist Thomas Dolby once remarked that he didn't find the JV as immediate in usability as his older synthesizers. The JV-2080 has featured in the studios of Tidy Trax Records, a Hard House record label based in the UK. Australian Electro band Gerling used the JV-1080 on their album Children Of Telepathic Experiences. LTJ Bukem and Photek have also used it in music production and film scoring, respectively. Other users include Midge Ure, Gary Barlow, Armin van Buuren, Glen Ballard, Jimmy Douglass, London Elektricity, 1 Giant Leap, David Frank, and Máni Svavarsson.
