= Radiophonie Vol. 10 =

Soundtrack album by Jean-Michel Jarre
- Released: 24 July 2020
- Recorded: 2016
- Genres: Electronic, soundtrack, jingle
- Length: 4:32:19
- Label: Radio France Signature
- Producer: Jean-Michel Jarre

Jean-Michel Jarre chronology
Equinoxe Infinity (2019)	Radiophonie Vol. 10 (2020)	Amazônia (2021)

Radiophonie Vol. 10 is a soundtrack album by the French electronic musician and composer Jean-Michel Jarre for the French news network France Info released on 24 July 2022. The soundtrack is titled Hexagone and continues where Radiophonie Vol. 9 stopped. In fact, the first disc of the 4 disc compilation is the entire Radiophonie Vol. 9 album. The album was sold exclusively at the French retail chain Fnac.
