= Sessions 2000 =

Studio album by Jean-Michel Jarre
- Released: 4 November 2002
- Studio: Croissy studio
- Genre: Electronica; lounge; ambient; cool jazz
- Length: 42:54
- Label: Disques Dreyfus
- Producer: Jean Michel Jarre

Jean-Michel Jarre chronology
Interior Music (2001)	Sessions 2000 (2002)	Geometry of Love (2003)

Sessions 2000 is the fourteenth studio album by French electronic musician and composer Jean-Michel Jarre, released on Disques Dreyfus and distributed by Sony Music in 2002. On January 7, 2003 was released in US. Sessions 2000 featured Francis Rimbert, and was recorded at Croissy studio and later mixed at Square Prod studio by Joachim Garraud. According to Jarre, the album was made as part of a duology meant to fulfill his contract with Dreyfus as quickly as possible following a personal and legal falling out with Francis Dreyfus; the other album, Experimental 2001, went unreleased. The feud with Dreyfus additionally informed the album's jazz-driven sound, as Jarre had previously encouraged him to reorient the label towards the genre. Sessions 2000 reached the 140th position in French charts.

== Reception ==
Professional ratings
Review scores
Source	Rating
AllMusic	4/5 stars

Billboard write that the "tracks all share a certain cinematic scope, which is not unusual for ambient tunes, but Jarre has put a good deal of effort into evoking a pensive, understated, jazz feel that, at times–particularly on “March”–is reminiscent of Miles Davis’ late work." Also added that "he's created a deeply nuanced soundscape that invites repeated listening".

Lorna Palmer from BBC commented that "the album is laced with acoustic instruments (a mix of live playing and samples) placed over a backdrop of seamless ambient electronics and soft trip hop grooves, with chilled jazzy undertones throughout." PopMatters described it as "an enjoyable and very listenable experience." Amy Hanson of AllMusic stated that "Jarre's six-track view of a year is energetic, invigorating, and after-dinner-drink smooth."

== Track listing ==
All tracks are written by Jean-Michel Jarre.

No.	Title	Length
1.	"January 24"	5:57
2.	"March 23"	8:02
3.	"May 1"	4:49
4.	"June 21"	6:18
5.	"September 14"	9:30
6.	"December 17"	8:11
Total length:		42:54

== Personnel ==
- Jean-Michel Jarre - keyboards, synthesizer, sound programming
- Francis Rimbert - keyboards, sampler, additional programming

== Equipment ==
Equipment instruments used in the album:

- Roland XP-80
- Eminent 310U
- ARP 2600
- Minimoog
- Korg KARMA
- Novation Digital Music Systems Supernova II
- microKORG
- Roland JP-8000
- Korg Mini Pops 7
- Digisequencer
- E-mu Systems XL7
- Roland Handsonic
- EMS Synthi AKS
- EMS VCS 3
- RMI Harmonic Synthesizer

== Charts ==
Chart (2002)	Peak position
French Albums (SNEP)	140
