= Roland HandSonic =

Hand percussion pad

HandSonic HPD-20
- Manufacturer: Roland

Technical specifications
- Effects: Multi-Effects: 3 systems, 25 types, Ambience: 10 types, 3-band Kit EQ

Input/output
- Keyboard: 13 pads, pressure-sensitive pads
- External control: D-BEAM, Realtime Modify knob

The HandSonic HPD-20 musical instrument is a hand percussion pad introduced by the Roland Corporation. It was reviewed by digitalDrummer Magazine in 2013. It can be played on its own or used as an addition to a larger drum kit. The dynamic pads are made of rubber to reduce fatigue on the hands. The rear panel includes a mix-in stereo input along with a stereo headphone output and two quarter inch jacks.

== On board sounds ==
Each pad can be assigned different sounds. There are 850 on board that range from traditional drum kits to retro drum machines such as the 808 and 909. Exotic sounds including congas, bongos, djembe and tablas round out the device's factory presets. Above the LCD is The D-BEAM, a motion sensitive invisible infra-red beam of light that can both trigger and process percussion instruments.

== WAV file import ==
Up to 500 WAV files can be stored via USB flash memory into the Handsonic. The sample time is up to 12 minutes in mono (16-bit, 44.1 kHz) or six minutes in stereo.

== Notable Users ==
Jean-Michel Jarre
