= Musique pour supermarché =

Musique pour Supermarché

Studio album by Jean-Michel Jarre
- Released: 6 July 1983
- Recorded: February–May 1983
- Genre: Electronic
- Length: 29:49
- Label: Disques Dreyfus
- Producer: Jean-Michel Jarre

Jean-Michel Jarre chronology
| Les Concerts en Chine (1982) | Musique pour Supermarché (1983) | Zoolook (1984) |

Professional ratings
Review scores
| Source | Rating |
|---|---|
| Encyclopedia of Popular Music | 3/5 stars |

Musique pour Supermarché (English title: Music for Super Markets) is the sixth studio album by electronic musician and composer Jean-Michel Jarre. Only a single vinyl copy was ever pressed. It was sold at an auction, where its master plates were deliberately destroyed. However, later Jarre albums such as Zoolook (1984) or Rendez-Vous (1986) sample/reuse several parts of the album.

== Composition and recording ==
In 1983, Jarre was approached to create background music for a supermarket-themed art show Orrimbe, to be held in Paris during June 1983. Jarre recorded the album between February and May. Comparing the album to a painting, "not just a worthless commercial product", he chose to auction it along with other art pieces. The auction was held on July 6, 1983, at the Hôtel Drouot auction house in Paris, and raised about 69,000 francs (equivalent to 8,960 dollars at the time) for charity. Jarre explained this was his protest at the "silly industrialisation of music".

In the inside cover, 11 polaroid photos show the step-by-step creation of the disc, leaving one slot so that the final owner could add their photo with the album. The album owner was kept anonymous at first, but later revealed to be real estate dealer M. Gérard. Shortly after the auction, Jarre allowed Radio Luxembourg to broadcast the album once, in its entirety, and encouraged listeners to record the broadcast with the words "Piratez-moi!" (Pirate me!). Various parts of this album would be reworked for later Jarre projects such as Zoolook (1984) or Rendez-Vous (1986). A demo version of "Musique pour Supermarché (Part 1)" was included on the 2018 compilation Planet Jarre: 50 Years of Music.

== Track listing ==
All music is composed by Jean-Michel Jarre.

Side one
| No. | Title | Length |
|---|---|---|
| 1. | "Musique pour Supermarché Overture" | 4:09 |
| 2. | "Musique pour Supermarché Part I" | 2:18 |
| 3. | "Musique pour Supermarché Part II" | 3:29 |
| 4. | "Musique pour Supermarché Part III" | 2:17 |
| 5. | "Musique pour Supermarché Part IV" | 3:52 |

Side two
| No. | Title | Length |
|---|---|---|
| 1. | "Musique pour Supermarché Part V" | 5:53 |
| 2. | "Musique pour Supermarché Part VI" | 3:59 |
| 3. | "Musique pour Supermarché Part VII" | 3:51 |

The duration of the tracks is calculated from bootleg recordings, as the album has never officially been released internationally.

== See also ==
- Once Upon a Time in Shaolin, an album by American hip hop artists Wu-Tang Clan of which only one copy was released
- List of most valuable records
