= Amazônia (album) =

Studio album by Jean-Michel Jarre
- Released: 9 April 2021
- Recorded: 2021
- Studios: JMJ Studio, Paris
- Genres: Electronic; ambient
- Length: 52:47
- Label: Sony Music
- Producer: Jean-Michel Jarre

Jean-Michel Jarre chronology
| Radiophonie Vol. 10 (2020) | Amazônia (2021) | Radiophonie Vol. 12 (2022) |

Amazônia is the twenty-first studio album by French musician and composer Jean-Michel Jarre, released on 9 April 2021 by Columbia Records.

== Background ==
The album serves as the 52-minute musical score for the exhibition Amazônia, a project by photographer and filmmaker Sebastião Salgado presented from May to October 2021 in the Paris Philharmonic complex. Jarre had access to the Museum of Ethnology in the city of Geneva, Switzerland.

The exhibition focuses on the Brazilian Amazon, featuring more than 200 photographs and other media by Salgado. In this album, electronic and orchestral instruments were combined with natural sounds. As well as a standard stereo version released on CD and LP, a binaural version and a 5.1 surround sound version were made available in digital download.

Some of the revenues will be sent back to the Indigenous communities where the recordings were made, according to a statement in the CD booklet and on the LP cover. It is not yet apparent how this will be accomplished.

== Track listing ==
All tracks are written by Jean-Michel Jarre.

Amazônia track listing
| No. | Title | Length |
|---|---|---|
| 1. | "Amazônia Part 1" | 7:42 |
| 2. | "Amazônia Part 2" | 9:59 |
| 3. | "Amazônia Part 3" | 8:10 |
| 4. | "Amazônia Part 4" | 3:16 |
| 5. | "Amazônia Part 5" | 6:04 |
| 6. | "Amazônia Part 6" | 3:33 |
| 7. | "Amazônia Part 7" | 4:18 |
| 8. | "Amazônia Part 8" | 3:19 |
| 9. | "Amazônia Part 9" | 6:23 |
| Total length: | | 52:47 |

== Personnel ==
Adapted from album booklet:

- Jean-Michel Jarre – production, mixing
- Patrick Pelamourgues – technical assistance
- David Perreau – mastering
- Sebastião Salgado – Amazônia photographs
- Gong Li – Jean-Michel Jarre portrait
- Renato Amoroso – Sebastião Salgado portrait
- Eric BDFCK Cornic – graphic design

== Charts ==
Chart performance for Amazônia
| Chart (2021) | Peak position |
|---|---|
| Austrian Albums (Ö3 Austria) | 13 |
| Belgian Albums (Ultratop Flanders) | 23 |
| Belgian Albums (Ultratop Wallonia) | 6 |
| Dutch Albums (Album Top 100) | 24 |
| French Albums (SNEP) | 34 |
| German Albums (Offizielle Top 100) | 5 |
| Hungarian Albums (MAHASZ) | 30 |
| Polish Albums (ZPAV) | 6 |
| Portuguese Albums (AFP) | 7 |
| Scottish Albums (Official Charts) | 4 |
| Spanish Albums (Promusicae) | 23 |
| Swiss Albums (Schweizer Hitparade) | 4 |
| UK Albums (Official Charts) | 21 |
