= Oxymore =

2022 album by Jean-Michel Jarre

Studio album by Jean-Michel Jarre
- Released: 21 October 2022
- Recorded: 2021
- Genres: Dance; EDM; ambient
- Length: 49:02
- Labels: Sony; Columbia
- Producer: Jean-Michel Jarre

Jean-Michel Jarre chronology
Radiophonie Vol. 12 (2022)	Oxymore (2022)	Oxymoreworks (2023)

Singles from Oxymore
- 1. "Brutalism" Released: 26 August 2022

Oxymore is the twenty-second studio album by French musician and composer Jean-Michel Jarre. It was released on 21 October 2022 through Sony and Columbia.

== Background ==
Originally, Jarre was planning a collaboration with the French composer Pierre Henry, one of Jarre's influences, but Henry died in 2017 and the collaboration was never completed. Henry had however recorded some sound bites for the collaboration, which Jarre used for the album. Jarre then added his own compositions on top.

Jarre stated: "I chose some of his sounds precisely from one track to another. 'Oxymore' is also a tribute to the French way of approaching modern music, electroacoustic music, and my early studies at the GRM where Pierre definitely influenced the future of electronic music worldwide, along with Pierre Schaeffer."

Jarre was also inspired by the French movement “musique concrete”, a genre that utilises recorded sounds as raw material.

Jarre stated that the true sound is not stereo but can be heard in 360 degrees. He stated that the album can be best heard with headphones or more advanced audio systems.

"Brutalism" is the first single of the album. Several remixes have been done, including one by Martin Gore of Depeche Mode and another by Deathpact.

Jarre also did several VR live shows called "Oxyville", providing a digital stage for him to perform the album live in VR. One of the shows was broadcast live in 2D on Jarre's social media channels on 24 October 2022.

Virtual world Oxyville was developed by French company VRROOM and became publicly available from 24 October 2022. VR Project produced by Jean-Michel Jarre and Louis Cacciuttolo, designed by art-director Pavel Pavlyukov and directed by Georgy Molodtsov received Webby Awards - People's Voice Winner in Metaverse, Immersive & Virtual / Best Experiential Design category in 2023, as well Nomination and Honoree in 2022, Raindance Immersive Honourable Mentioning, Stereopsia Crystal Owl Award for the Best Production Design and Producers Guild of America Innovation Award nomination.

== Reviews ==
Professional ratings
Aggregate scores
Source	Rating
Metacritic	74/100
Review scores
Source	Rating
Classic Rock	3/5 stars
Mojo	4/5 stars
musicOMH	3/5 stars
Uncut	7/10

Julian Marszalek of Classic Rock rated it three stars out of five and called it "an album that asks more questions than it offers answers". Marszalek also found that the album offers mixed results.

Gianluca Faliero of Parkett wrote that it is not one of Jarre's better albums.

Shrey Kathuria of The Quietus describes Oxymore as "a record that cleverly entwines dark and tense songwriting and delivers a hauntingly curious resolution, like the ending of the very computer games it so adroitly emulates"

== Formats ==
Oxymore was released on CD, double vinyl and digital in stereo, binaural, 5.1 and Dolby Atmos mixes. The physical product also includes a code to access the highest quality binaural master.

== Track listing ==
All tracks are written by Jean-Michel Jarre.

Oxymore track listing
No.	Title	Length
1.	"Agora"	1:34
2.	"Oxymore"	4:45
3.	"Neon Lips"	4:27
4.	"Sonic Land"	6:01
5.	"Animal Genesis"	5:46
6.	"Synthy Sisters"	3:20
7.	"Sex in the Machine"	5:45
8.	"Zeitgeist"	3:06
9.	"Crystal Garden"	4:09
10.	"Brutalism"	4:41
11.	"Epica"	5:25
Total length:		49:02

== Charts ==
Chart performance for Oxymore
Chart (2022)	Peak position
Austrian Albums (Ö3 Austria)	17
Belgian Albums (Ultratop Flanders)	16
Belgian Albums (Ultratop Wallonia)	12
Dutch Albums (Album Top 100)	21
French Albums (SNEP)	20
German Albums (Offizielle Top 100)	14
Hungarian Albums (MAHASZ)	14
Italian Albums (FIMI)	99
Polish Albums (ZPAV)	11
Portuguese Albums (AFP)	24
Scottish Albums (Official Charts)	14
Spanish Albums (Promusicae)	27
Swiss Albums (Schweizer Hitparade)	11
UK Albums (Official Charts)	41
UK Dance Albums (Official Charts)	1
