= Pleasure Principle (fashion) =

Art project in New York

Pleasure Principle is a fashion label or artistic project founded in 2002, as a collaboration between New York-based artists/designers Adrian Cowen and Diva Pittala.

The inspiration for the project was to reflect "the night life and the inspiring boom of the contemporary art world of new york post 9/11."

Graphic elements are designed to offer glimpses of an imagined identity, and are intended to reflect the dark side of pleasure - hence the Freudian 'pleasure principle' name. The collection is today represented by retailers such as Seven New York, Assembly New York, Luisa Via Roma, Corso Como Seoul, Harvey Nichols HK, La Garçonne, Maxfield, and Apartment in Berlin.
