= Roland JV-1080 =

Sound module from Roland Corporation

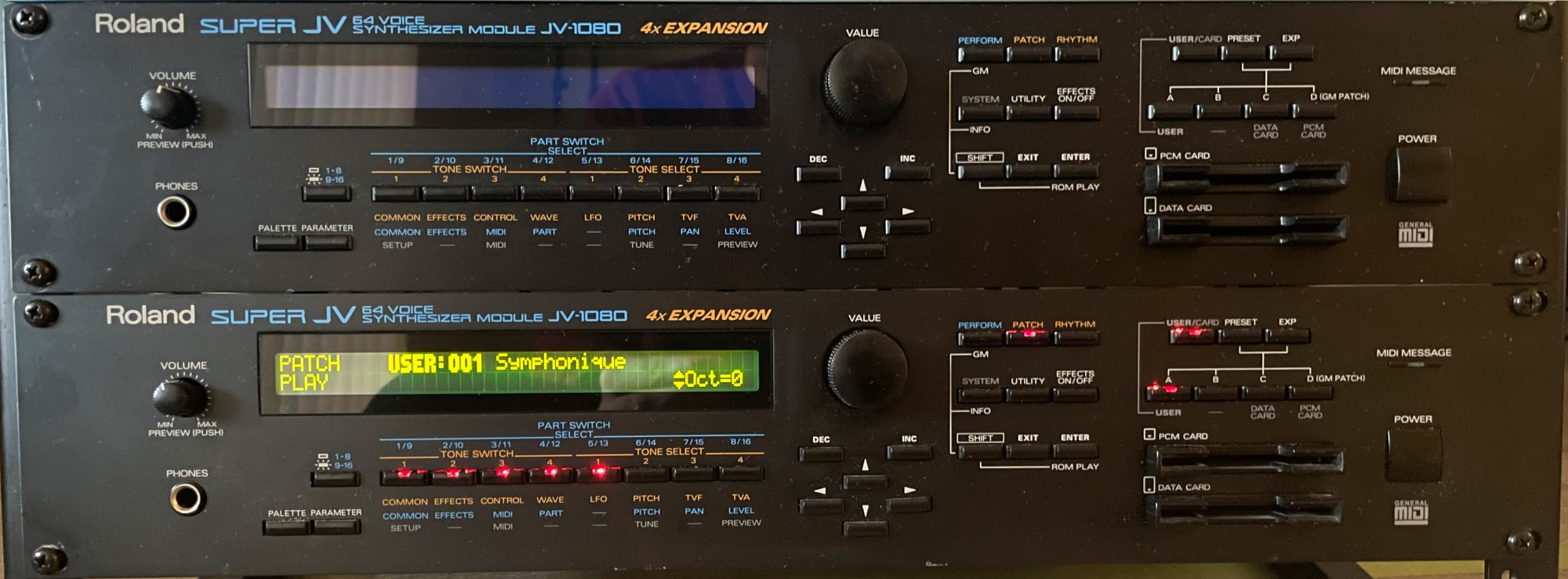
- Manufacturer: Roland
- Dates: 1994–2000

Technical specifications
- Polyphony: 64 voices/64 oscillators
- Timbrality: 16-part multitimbral
- Oscillator: 64 total/4 or fewer ("tones") per voice
- LFO: 2 per tone, with eight waveforms
- Synthesis type: Sample-based synthesis
- Filter: 1 12dB/octave TVF (Time Variant Filter) per tone, with resonance and its own envelope
- Attenuator: 1 TVA (Time Variant Amplifier) per tone

Input/output
- Keyboard: none
- External control: MIDI (In, Out, Thru)

JV-1080 bass example
The JV-1080 is well known for its bass presets, this is one such example.

JV-1080 'black rain'
A highly atmospheric preset from an expansion card, produced through multiple 'tones' (layers).

JV-1080 pad example
A typical airy pad common to the JV-1080.

JV-1080 'raggertronic'
A fairly infamous stock preset with extremely evolving characteristics; demonstrating the JV-1080's ability as a very flexible ROMpler.

The Roland JV-1080 (a.k.a. Super JV, Super JV-1080, or simply 1080) is a sample-based synthesizer/sound module in the form of a 2U rack. The JV-1080's synthesizer engine was also used in Roland's XP-50 workstation (1995). Due to its library of high-quality sounds and multi-timbral capabilities, it became a mainstay with film composers.

== Features ==
The JV-1080 features a 64-Voice Polyphony, as well as 16-part Multi-timbral capabilities. From the factory, the JV-1080 comes with hundreds of patches, and several rhythm kits (8 megabytes total). It can be expanded with up to 4 SR-JV80 expansion cards, as well as a PCM and Data card, to provide up to 42 megabytes.

== Factory Sounds ==
The core sampled waveforms of the JV-1080 were developed by Roland R&D-LA in Culver City, California.

Many of the most well-known factory presets and expansion board sounds of the JV-series were created by Eric Persing and Ace Yukawa.

== Notable users of the JV-1080 ==
- 808 State
- Hirokazu Ando
- Arthur Baker
- Tony Banks
- Gary Barlow
- Franco Battiato
- Roddy Bottum
- Vince Clarke
- Luis Delgado
- Depeche Mode
- Dubstar
- Giorgio Faletti
- Dario G
- Jens Gad
- Keith Hopwood
- Ihsahn
- Tame Impala
- Michael Jackson
- Jens Johansson
- Bradley Joseph
- Kenji Kawai
- Eliot Kennedy
- Grant Kirkhope
- Jerry Martin
- Nathan McCree
- Kenta Nagata
- The Neptunes
- OMD
- Philip Pope
- Rhythm Plate
- RMB
- Paul Shaffer
- Paul Van Dyk
- Vangelis
- Hans Zimmer
- Keith Zizza

== Expansion Cards ==
The SR-JV80 (aka "SR-JV") PCM expansion boards (8MB of PCM-ROM each plus associated preset patches) can be used in the Roland XP-50, XP-60, XP-80, JV-1080 and XV-5080, which can each hold four expansion cards, as well as the JV-2080, which can hold eight expansion cards, in addition to compatibility with a number of additional Roland models.

The three Experience expansion boards contain a selection of sounds from different expansion boards in a single card.

- SR-JV80-01: Pop
- SR-JV80-02: Orchestral
- SR-JV80-03: Piano
- SR-JV80-04: Vintage Synth
- SR-JV80-05: World
- SR-JV80-06: Dance (Note: Due to copyright problems Roland stopped distributing SR-JV80-06 Dance expansion board.)
- SR-JV80-07: Super Sound Set
- SR-JV80-08: Keyboards of the 60s & 70s
- SR-JV80-09: Session
- SR-JV80-10: Bass and Drums
- SR-JV80-11: Techno
- SR-JV80-12: Hip-Hop
- SR-JV80-13: Vocal
- SR-JV80-14: Asia
- SR-JV80-15: Special FX
- SR-JV80-16: Orchestral II
- SR-JV80-17: Country
- SR-JV80-18: Latin World
- SR-JV80-19: House
- SR-JV80-97: Experience III
- SR-JV80-98: Experience II
- SR-JV80-99: Experience

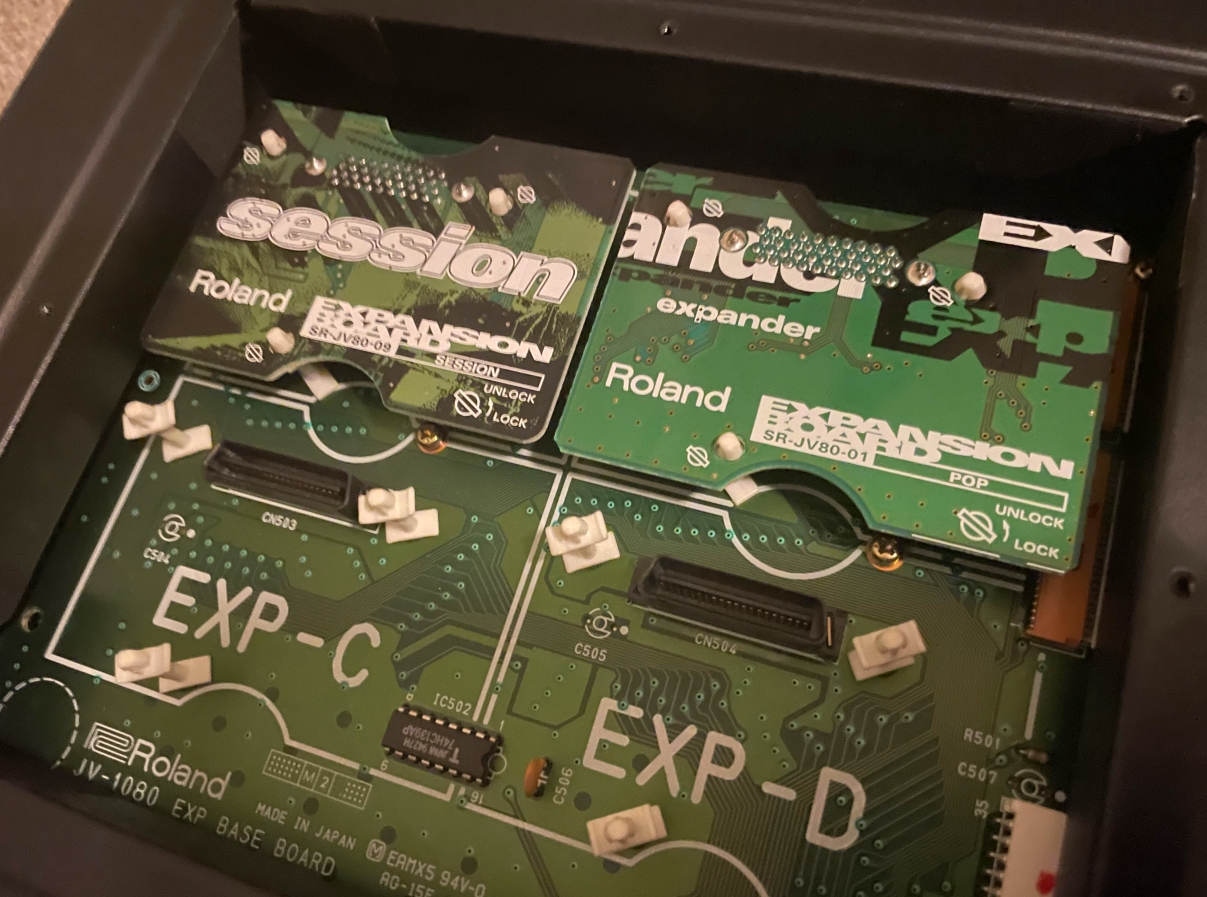
JV-1080 opened revealing expansion cards

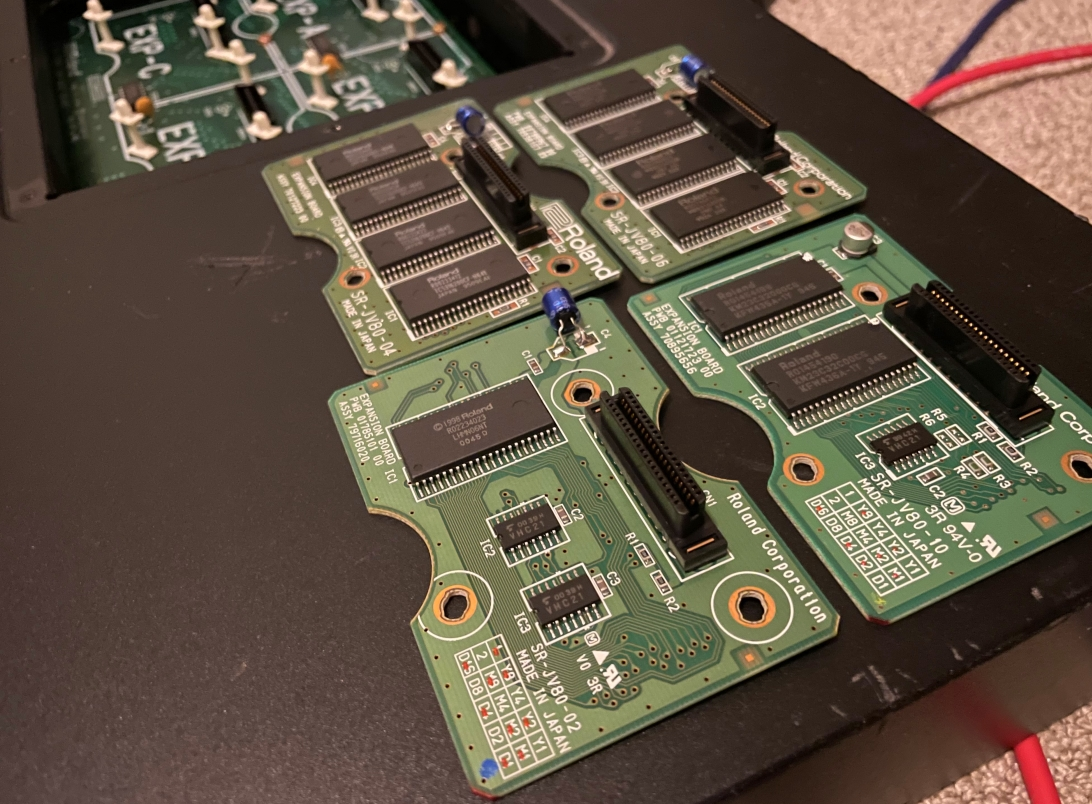
SR-JV80 cards on top of a JV-1080
