= Roland XP-50 =

Music workstation

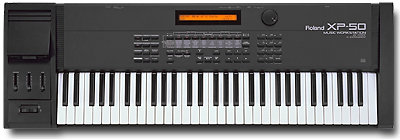
- Manufacturer: Roland Corporation
- Dates: 1995
- Price: $1995 MSRP

Technical specifications
- Polyphony: 64 voices maximum
- Timbrality: 16-part Timbrality
- Oscillator: 512 waveforms
- LFO: up to 8 MIDI-syncable
- Synthesis type: Sample-based synthesis
- Filter: 1 VCF referred to as a Time Variant Filter (TVF)
- Aftertouch expression: yes
- Velocity expression: yes
- Storage memory: 640 patches, 128 performances
- Effects: 40 multi-effects, reverb, chorus

Input/output
- Keyboard: 61 keys
- Left-hand control: Pitchbend / modulation lever
- External control: MIDI in/out, pedal switch

The Roland XP-50 is a music workstation that combines the synthesizer engine of Roland's JV-1080 sound module with the sequencing capabilities of their MRC-Pro sequencer and a 61-note keyboard. First released in 1995, the XP-50 and the Roland XP-10 were the first two Roland XP-series products, later joined by the XP-80 and XP-30.

== Sound Engine ==
The XP-50's sound engine utilizes a custom 32-bit RISC chip to accommodate its sound generation and effects processing. There are 640 patches and 128 performances on board. The XP-50's internal memory includes 512 waveforms, which can be expanded with up to four user-installable SR-JV80 expansion boards. Presets include a General MIDI soundset, and a wide selection of sounds, including ambient and techno sounds representative of the time of the XP-50's release.

The sample + synthesis sound engine's structure consists of "tones", each with a waveform, amplifier, filter, three envelope generators, and a pair of LFOs. Up to four "tones" can be combined in one of ten different "structures" or configurations to create a "patch." For multitimbral use, "patches" are slotted into "parts" to create a "performance."

Some of the more desirable features of the XP-50's sound engine are frequency cross-modulation, tone delay variations, MIDI clock sync, high/low/band pass and peaking resonant filter options, and synchronizable LFOs.

The XP-50 has 4 expansion slots which take any of the SR-JV series of boards.

== Effects ==
The XP-50 has three independent effects processors: reverb, chorus, and a multi-effects processor with 40 editable effects algorithms.

== Sequencer ==
The built-in 16-track sequencer is derived from the Roland MC-series hardware sequencers, and can import sequences saved on those machines. The XP-50 sequencer also accepts standard MIDI files. The sequencer can store up to 60,000 notes and 100 patterns.

Eschewing the PCM & Data Card slots that Roland had been using since the JD-800 in 1991, the XP-50 includes a 3.5 inch floppy disk drive for data import or export.
