= Radiophonie Vol. 9 =

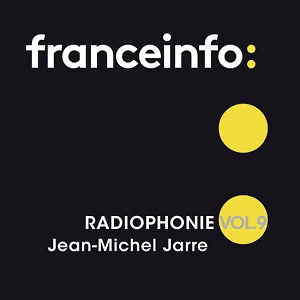

Soundtrack album by Jean-Michel Jarre
- Released: 13 January 2017
- Recorded: 2016
- Genres: Electronic, soundtrack, jingle
- Length: 61:18
- Label: Radio France Signature
- Producer: Jean-Michel Jarre

Jean-Michel Jarre chronology
Oxygène 3 (2016)	Radiophonie Vol. 9 (2017)	Planet Jarre (2018)

Radiophonie Vol. 9 is a soundtrack album by the French electronic musician and composer Jean-Michel Jarre, produced for the French news network France Info, released on 13 January 2017. The soundtrack was composed during 2016, and titled Hexagone.

== Charts ==
Chart performance for Radiophonie Vol. 9
Chart (2017)	Peak position
Belgian Albums (Ultratop Flanders)	142
Dutch Albums (Album Top 100)	141
