= Eric Persing =

American sound designer and musician

- Born: Eric Armand Persing; 21 July 1963 (age 63); Landstuhl, West Germany
- Known for: Spectrasonics, Sound design, Synthesizer Development, Music Production, Roland, LA Session Musician, Sound Libraries
- Notable work: Omnisphere, Keyscape, Roland D50, Roland JD800, Michael Jackson "Bad" album, Distorted Reality
- Spouse: Lorey Persing
- Children: Jazmine Persing, Soren Persing, Sage Persing
- Website: https://www.spectrasonics.net

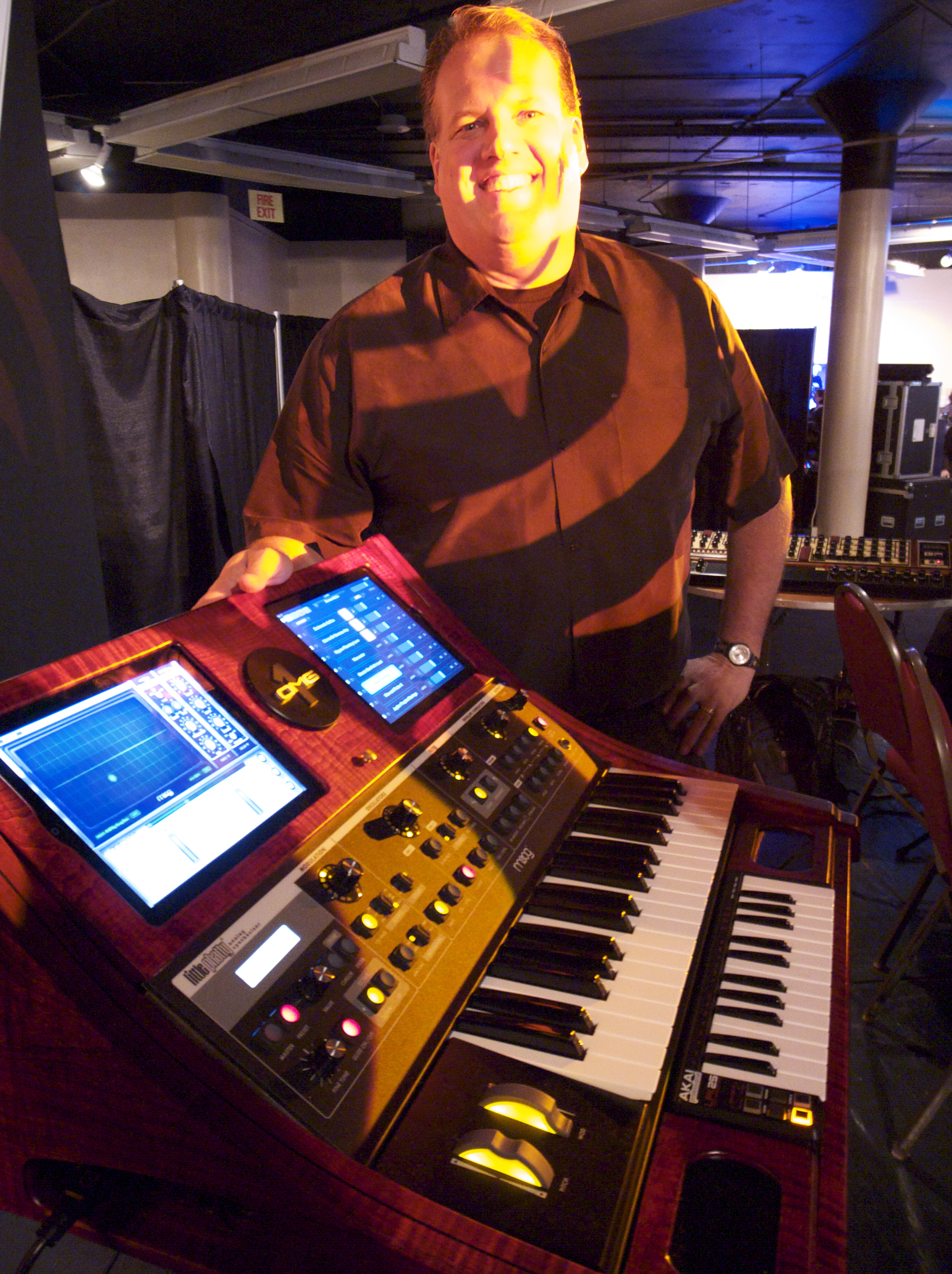
Eric Persing showing his synthesizer

Eric Persing is an American sound designer, professional synthesist, keyboardist, recording artist and music producer based in Los Angeles, California. One of the world's leading sound designers, he is best known as the founder and Creative Director of the music software and virtual instrument company Spectrasonics.

== Career ==
Persing started playing piano in the sixth grade before playing a Minimoog in 1975 and finding inspiration in synthesizers. In the early 1980s he moved to Los Angeles and began working as a session musician and arranger. This work, which continued for years, led to his working with such notable artists as Luther Vandross, Quincy Jones, Danny Elfman, Marcus Miller, Herbie Hancock, James Newton Howard, Eddie Jobson, Michel Colombier, Diana Ross, Arif Mardin, Chaka Khan, Larry Carlton, Hans Zimmer, Leonard Cohen, Michael Jackson, Randy Newman and Celine Dion.

In 1982 he began working at Goodman Music, a music store in Orange, California and became more proficient with synthesizers and the possibilities of new MIDI technology. Eventually he was recruited by Tom Beckman, the President of Roland US, to demo the company's products at the 1984 NAMM Show in Chicago. Roland made Persing the company's Chief Sound Designer, a position he held from 1984 to 2004, during which time he worked on many influential synthesizers and music-related products such as the Roland D-50, JD-800, the Roland JX, JV, JP, XP series synthesizers, and many others.

In 1994, inspired by his work with sample libraries for Roland, Persing co-founded Spectrasonics with his wife Lorey, releasing the company's first library, Bass Legends, featuring bass guitar samples played by Marcus Miller, John Patitucci, and Abraham Laboriel. Another library, Distorted Reality (1995), became one of the best-selling professional sample libraries of all time. In 2002, Spectrasonics shifted from sample libraries to virtual instruments, releasing Atmosphere and later Trilogy.

Since founding Spectrasonics, Persing has been the producer and primary contributor to all of the company's products, including the award-winning Omnisphere, Keyscape, Trilian, and Stylus RMX.

At the 2011 NAMM Show, as part of a joint promotion with the Bob Moog Foundation, Persing exhibited the OMG-1 synthesizer, a unique synthesizer of his own design that integrated a Moog Little Phatty with an Apple Mac Mini and two iPads running virtual instruments, all housed in a custom curly maple cabinet. In 2011 Persing's company released the Bob Moog Tribute Library for Omnisphere, with all proceeds going to the Bob Moog Foundation. Ten years later, the company released the Bob Moog Tribute Library 2, again donating all proceeds from the library's sale to the Bob Moog Foundation.

Persing has cited important musical influences of Vangelis, Kraftwerk, Jan Hammer, Yes, Genesis and Thomas Dolby.

== Awards ==
In 2011, Persing and his team accepted the TEC Award for "Best Musical Instrument Software" for Omnisphere version 1.5.
