= Jean-Michel Jarre =

French musician (born 1948)

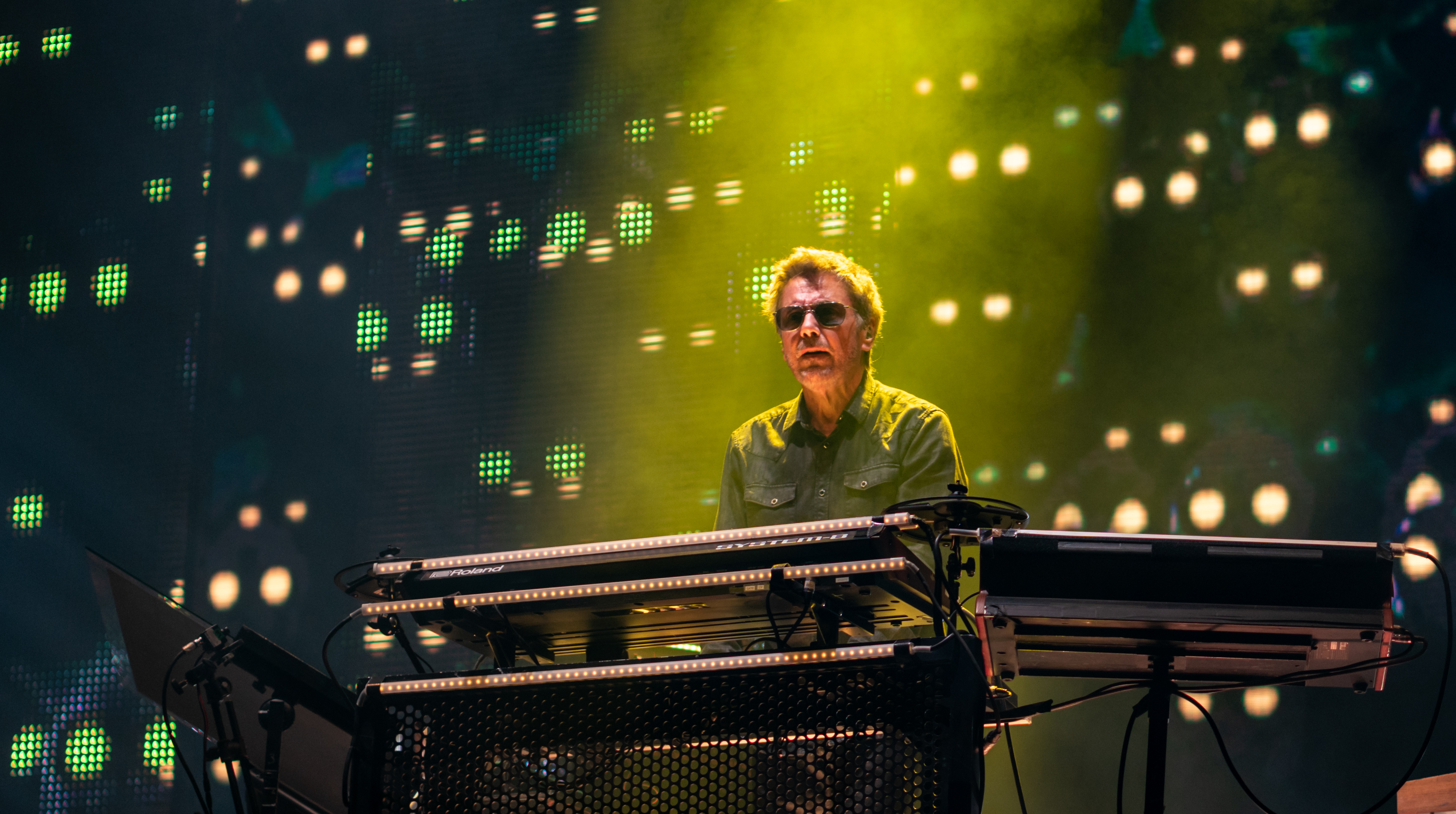
- Jarre at Coachella in 2018

Background information
- Born: Jean-Michel André Jarre; 24 August 1948 (age 78); Lyon, France
- Genres: Ambient; new-age; electronic; trance; progressive rock; space; synth-pop; techno
- Occupations: Composer; performer; record producer
- Instruments: Synthesizer; piano; organ; laser harp; accordion; guitar; bass guitar; theremin; keytar
- Years active: 1960–present
- Labels: Disques Dreyfus; BMG; Sony; Polydor; PolyGram; Epic; SME; Warner Bros.; EMI
- Spouses: Flore Guillard (m. 1975; div. 1977); Charlotte Rampling (m. 1978; div. 2002); Anne Parillaud (m. 2005; div. 2010); Gong Li (m. 2019)
- Website: jeanmicheljarre.com
- Father: Maurice Jarre

Signature
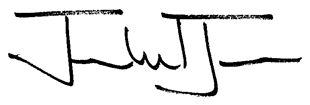

Jean-Michel André Jarre (Note: "Jean-Michel" is a single name, rather than two separate ones, although in certain cases it is written without the hyphen.) (French: [ʒɑ̃ miʃɛl ɑ̃dʁe ʒaʁ]; born 24 August 1948) is a French composer, performer and record producer. He is a pioneer in the electronic, ambient, and new-age genres, and is known for organising outdoor spectacles featuring his music, accompanied by vast laser displays, large projections and fireworks.

Jarre was born in Lyon, the son of the film composer Maurice Jarre and Francette Pejot, a member of the French Resistance. His parents separated when he was five and his father moved to the United States. Jarre was raised by his mother and spent part of each year with his grandparents in Lyon. He found classical piano difficult, but had lessons in harmony, counterpoint and fugue with a teacher from the Conservatoire de Paris. His early influences included jazz, street performers and the painter Pierre Soulages. In 1969 he joined the Groupe de Recherches Musicales, led by Pierre Schaeffer, the inventor of musique concrète, and began working with synthesisers.

His first mainstream success was with his third studio album Oxygène (1976). Recorded in a makeshift studio at his home, the album sold an estimated 18 million copies. Oxygène was followed in 1978 by Equinoxe, and in 1979, Jarre performed to a record-breaking audience of more than a million people at the Place de la Concorde, a record he has since broken three times. More albums followed, but his 1979 concert served as a blueprint for his future performances around the world. Several of his albums have been released to coincide with large-scale outdoor events.

As of 2004, Jarre had sold an estimated 80 million albums and singles. He was the first Western musician officially invited to perform in the People's Republic of China and held the world record for the largest-ever audience at an outdoor event for his Moscow concert on 6 September 1997, which was reputed to have been attended by about 3.5 million people.

== Biography ==
=== Early life, influences, and education ===
Jean-Michel Jarre was born in Lyon on 24 August 1948, to Francette Pejot, a French Resistance member and concentration camp survivor, and composer Maurice Jarre. His grandmother was Jewish. When Jarre was five, his parents separated, and his father moved to the United States, leaving him with his mother. He did not see his father again until reaching the age of 18.

For the first eight years of his life, Jarre spent six months each year at his maternal grandparents' flat on the Cours de Verdun, in the Perrache district of Lyon. Jarre's grandfather was an oboe player, engineer and inventor, designing an early audio mixer used at Radio Lyon. He also gave Jean-Michel his first tape recorder. From his vantage point high above the pavement, the young Jarre was able to observe street performers at work, an experience he later cited as proving influential on his art.

Jarre struggled with classical piano studies, although he later changed teachers and worked on his scales. A more general interest in musical instruments was sparked by his discovery at the Saint-Ouen flea market, where his mother sold antiques, of a Boris Vian trumpet violin. He often accompanied his mother to Le Chat Qui Pêche (The Fishing Cat), a Paris jazz club run by one of her friends from her resistance years, where saxophonists Archie Shepp and John Coltrane, and trumpet players Don Cherry and Chet Baker were regular performers. These early jazz experiences suggested to him that music may be "descriptive, without lyrics".

He was also influenced by the work of French artist Pierre Soulages, whose exhibition at the Musée d'Art Moderne de la Ville de Paris he attended. Soulages' paintings used multiple textured layers, and Jarre realised that "for the first time in music, you could act as a painter with frequencies and sounds". He was also influenced by classical, modernist music. In a 2004 interview for The Guardian, he spoke of the effect that a performance of Stravinsky's The Rite of Spring had upon him:

This is where Stravinsky created it in 1913, and it was a huge shock. I also saw the last concert by the great Arabic singer Om Khalsoum. She is the goddess, the Maria Callas of the Orient. Then I heard "Georgia on My Mind" by Ray Charles, and I realised that music can talk to your tummy. I was so impressed by the organic sensuality coming from Ray Charles's music – there was no intellectual process and it was great.

As a young man Jarre earned money by selling his paintings, exhibiting some of his works at the Lyon Gallery – L'Œil écoute, and by playing in a band called Mystère IV. While he studied at the Lycée Michelet, his mother arranged for him to take lessons in harmony, counterpoint and fugue with Jeannine Rueff of the Conservatoire de Paris. In 1967 he played guitar in a band called The Dustbins, who appear in the film Des garçons et des filles. He mixed instruments including the electric guitar and the flute with tape effects and other sounds.

More experimentation followed in 1968, when he began to use tape loops, radios and other electronic devices. In 1969, he joined the Groupe de Recherches Musicales (GRM), founded and led by Pierre Schaeffer, inventor of musique concrete. Jarre was introduced to the Moog modular synthesizer and spent time working at the studio of influential German composer Karlheinz Stockhausen in Cologne.

"La Cage"
Jarre's 1969 release "La Cage"

In the kitchen of his apartment in Rue de la Trémoille, Jarre set up a small makeshift recording studio. It included his first synthesiser, an EMS VCS 3, and an EMS Synthi AKS, each linked to Revox tape machines. For a 1969 exposition at the Maison de la Culture (Cultural House) in Reims, Jarre wrote the five-minute experimental instrumental "Happiness Is a Sad Song". That same year he composed and recorded "La Cage/Erosmachine", a mixture of harmony, tape effects and synthesisers, which was released in 1971.

=== 1970s ===
In 1971 Jarre was commissioned by choreographer Norbert Schmucki to perform a ballet called AOR ("the light" in Hebrew), at the Palais Garnier. He also composed background music for ballet, theatre, television programs, department stores, and advertising jingles for Pepsi-Cola, Nestlé and RTL. The music for airports, and North America libraries was composed with the VCS 3 and a Farfisa professional organ. From 1972 to 1975, Jean-Michel wrote music and lyrics for artists like Françoise Hardy, Gérard Lenorman, Christophe and Patrick Juvet. In 1972 he collaborated in an Olympia show and wrote music for the International Festival of Magic. In 1972 he also released his first solo album, Deserted Palace, and composed the soundtrack for Les Granges Brûlées (The Burned Barns).

"Oxygène IV"
"Oxygene (Part 4)" is his most successful track

Jarre's 1976 low-budget solo album Oxygène, recorded at his home studio, made him famous internationally. The music was made with analog synthesizers like the EMS VCS 3 and the EMS Synthi AKS, and recorded with a Scully professional 8-track recorder. Jarre initially was turned down by several record companies, until he decided to meet with Francis Dreyfus, the head of the Disques Motors label, to see whether he could release the album, to which he accepted. The first pressing of 50,000 copies was promoted through hi-fi shops, clubs and discos, and by April 1977 had sold 70,000 copies in France. When interviewed in Billboard magazine, Motors's director Stanislas Witold said: "In a sense we're putting most of our bets on Jean-Michel Jarre. He is quite exceptional and we're sure that by 1980 he will be recognised worldwide."

Jarre's follow-up album, Equinoxe, was released in 1978. Though its sales were still healthy, it had less of an impact than Oxygène. But in 1979 Jarre held a large open-air concert on Bastille Day, at the Place de la Concorde. The free outdoor event set a world record for the largest number of spectators ever at an open-air concert, drawing more than 1 million spectators. Although it was not the first time he had performed in concert (Jarre had already played at the Paris Opera Ballet), the 40-minute event, which used projections of light, images and fireworks, served as a blueprint for Jarre's future concerts. Its popularity helped create a surge in sales—a further 800,000 records were sold between 14 July and 31 August 1979—and the Frenchman Francis Rimbert featured at the event.

=== 1980s ===
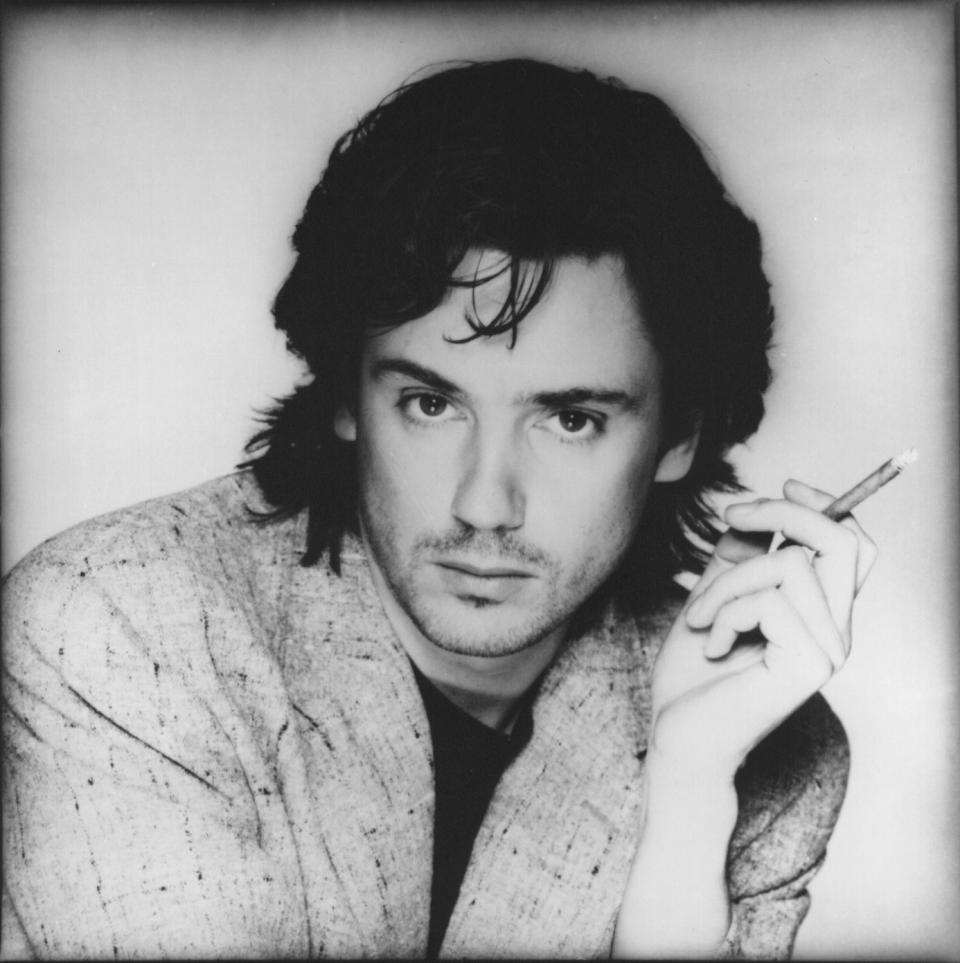
Jarre in 1986

By the time Les Chants Magnétiques was released on 20 May 1981, Oxygène and Equinoxe had achieved global sales of about 6 million units. In its first two months the new album sold 200,000 units in France alone. The album uses sounds from the Fairlight CMI, a new instrument of which Jarre was a pioneer. Its digital technology allowed him to continue his earlier sonic experimentation in new ways.

In that same year, the British Embassy gave Radio Beijing copies of Oxygène, Equinoxe, and Les Chants Magnétiques, which became the first pieces of foreign music to be played on Chinese national radio in decades. The Republic invited Jarre to become the first western musician to play in post-Mao Zedong China. The performances were scheduled to run from 18 October to 5 November 1981. 5 concerts were performed, two in Beijing and three in Shanghai. The first, in Beijing, was initially attended mostly by officials, but before the concert began, technicians realised that not enough power was available to supply the stage and auditorium. Chinese officials solved the problem by temporarily cutting power to the surrounding districts.

The stadium was almost full when the concert began, but as Beijing's buses stopped running at about 10 o'clock, about half the audience left before it finished. To boost the audience attendance for the second night, Jarre and his production team purchased some of the concert tickets and gave them to children on the streets. Jarre originally wanted the concerts to be free, but the Chinese authorities decided to charge between £0.20 and £0.50 per ticket. In 1982, recordings of the concerts, which featured one of Jarre's signature electronic instruments, the laser harp, were released as a double-disc LP.

"Zoolook" (remix)
"Zoolook" also demonstrates heavy use of the Fairlight CMI

Between February and May 1983, Jarre recorded a single LP copy of an album entitled Musique pour Supermarché (English: Music for Supermarkets) whose objective was to be the soundtrack of a show called Orrimbe, to later be auctioned with the master tapes and plates destroyed. The album was later broadcast exclusively on Radio Luxembourg with Jarre encouraging listeners to record the broadcast.

In 1984, he released seventh studio album Zoolook. In this album he expanded the sample-based approach which had been initiated on Les Chants Magnétiques and continued on Music for Supermarkets. The album was based around multiple fragments of human voices pronouncing words and speeches in different languages from all over the world, recorded digitally by Jarre and then played back and edited on the Fairlight CMI.

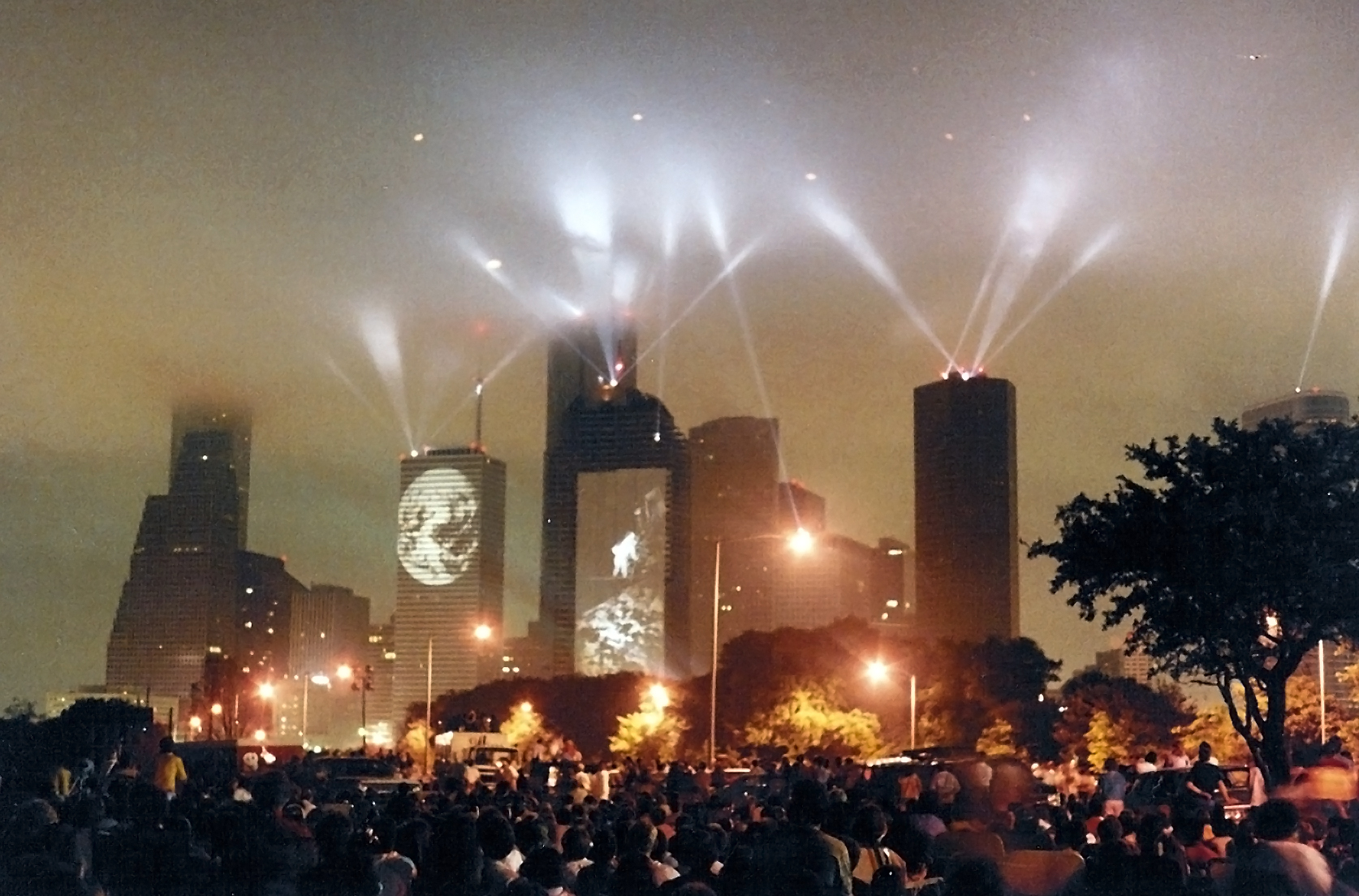
Rendez-vous Houston, 1986

In 1985, Jarre was invited by the musical director of the Houston Grand Opera to perform a concert celebrating Texas's 150th anniversary on 5 April 1986. Although he was busy with other projects and was at first unimpressed by the proposal, on a later visit to the city, he was immediately impressed by the visual grandeur of the city's skyline and agreed to perform. Also, 1985 marked the 25th anniversary of the foundation of the Lyndon B. Johnson Space Center; and NASA asked Jarre to integrate the anniversary into the concert.

"Third Rendez-Vous"
Third Rendez-Vous, normally performed in concert on the laser harp

Jarre worked with several Houston-based astronauts, including Bruce McCandless II and Ronald McNair, an accomplished musician who was to have played the saxophone on "Rendez-Vous VI", recorded in the weightless environment of space. The live performance was curtailed by McNair's death in the Space Shuttle Challenger disaster on 28 January 1986. Consideration was given to the cancellation of the concert; but McCandless contacted Jarre and urged him to proceed, in memory of the shuttle's crew. McNair's saxophone piece was recorded by French saxophonist Pierre Gossez and retitled "Ron's Piece". At Jarre's giant concerts in Houston and Lyon, the part was performed by McNair's friend, American saxophonist Kirk Whalum:

I remember just before take-off, Ron calling me in Paris saying "Everything's ready, see you in a week's time, watch me on television for the take-off" ... I will really, keep always, the bit of Ron's smile and Ron's face in my heart.

About 2,000 projectors shone images onto buildings and giant screens up to 1,200 feet (370 m) high, transforming the city's skyscrapers into spectacular backdrops for an elaborate display of fireworks and lasers. Rendez-vous Houston entered the Guinness Book of Records for its audience of over 1.5 million, beating his earlier record, set in 1979. The display was so impressive that a nearby freeway (I-45) was blocked by passing vehicles, forcing police & highway patrol to close it for the duration of the concert. Several months later he performed to an audience of about a million at his home city of Lyon, in celebration of a visit by Pope John Paul II. Watching from Lyon Cathedral, the Pope began the concert with a good-night blessing, a recording of which appears on Cities in Concert – Houston/Lyon.

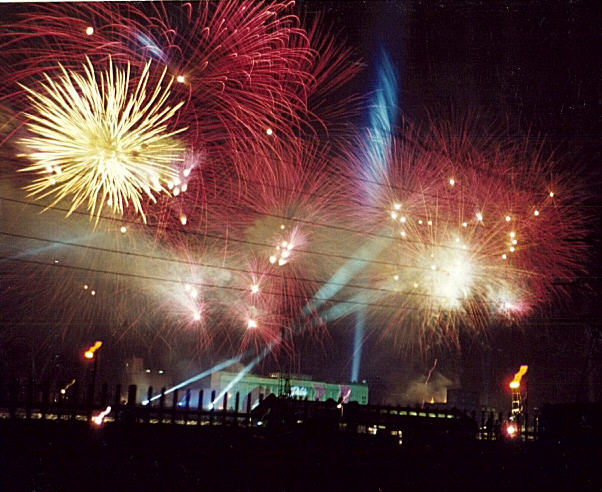
Destination Docklands, October 1988

In 1988, Jarre released his ninth studio album Revolutions, and in same year, a concert called Destination Docklands was planned for September, to be held at the Royal Victoria Dock in east London. Close to the heart of London, the location was chosen in part for its desolate environment, but also because Jarre thought the architecture was ideally suited for his music. Early in 1988 Jarre met with local officials and members of the community, but Newham Borough Council delayed their decision until 12 September, the month in which the show was due to take place. The local fire service were also concerned about access in the event of a fire. Site work continued as Jarre's team searched for alternative locations in which to stage the concert, but following improvements to both on and off-site safety Jarre eventually won conditional approval on 28 September to stage two separate performances, on 8 and 9 October.

The floating stage on which Jarre and his musicians performed was built on top of four large barges. Large purpose-built display screens were built, and one of the buildings to be used as a backdrop was painted white. One large mirror ball being transported to the event fell onto the roadside, causing a degree of confusion as some people mistook it for a fallen satellite. World War II searchlights were installed, to illuminate the sky and surrounding architecture.

Along with thousands in the surrounding streets and parks, 200,000 people watched Jarre and guests such as guitarist Hank Marvin perform in less than ideal conditions. Inclement weather had threatened to break the stage from its moorings, putting paid to the original plan to float the stage across the Royal Victoria Dock. Wind speeds were so high that television cameras were blown over. On the second evening the audience, which included Diana, Princess of Wales, was soaked by rain and wind.

=== 1990s ===
In 1990, Jarre released En Attendant Cousteau (Waiting for Cousteau), a tribute to the French oceanographer Jacques-Yves Cousteau. On Bastille Day he performed a concert at La Défense in Paris, attended by a record-breaking audience of about two million people, again beating his earlier world record. He later promoted a concert near the Pyramids of Teotihuacan in Mexico, to be held during the solar eclipse of 11 July 1991. However, with only weeks to go, important equipment had not arrived and the sinking in the Atlantic Ocean of a cargo ship containing the purpose-built pyramidal stage and other technical and financial problems made staging the concert impossible. Jarre's disappointment was such that he "could not cope with Mexican food for two years".

About two years later he released Chronologie, an album that features Jarre's traditional collection of instruments like the ARP 2600 and Minimoog, as well as newer synthesisers such as the Roland JD-800 and the Kurzweil K2000.

"Chronologie Part 4"
The opening few moments of "Chronologie Part 4"

In the state of mind I did Chronologie, it's quite close to what I did for Oxygène, using a lot of the old synthesizers of the '70s, like the Moog synthesizer — which I consider to be the Stradivarius of electronic music — mixed with the digital sound and the beat of the dance scene of the '90s. In a sense, Chronologie is a kind of mixture between the sounds of the '70s and the sounds of the '90s.

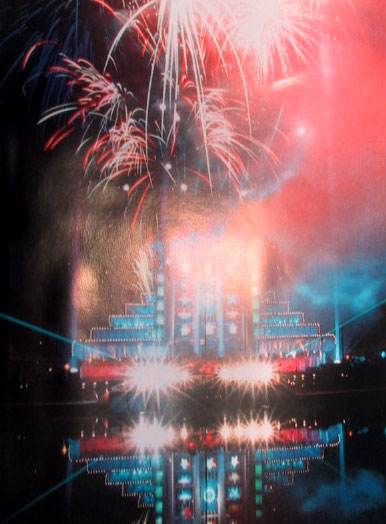
1993 Michel Jarre concert at Heysel Stadium, Brussels

Jarre was invited to the inaugural celebrations of the Palace of the Lost City, a hotel located within the Sun City in South Africa. Three concerts were held on 1, 2 and 3 December 1992, in which more than 45,000 people attended.

Chronologie was performed at a series of 16 performances across Europe called Europe in Concert. These were on a smaller scale than his previous concerts, featuring a miniature skyline, laser imaging and fireworks. Locations included Lausanne, Mont St Michel, London, Manchester, Barcelona, Seville and the Versailles Palace near Paris. In March 1994, a concert was held in Hong Kong, to mark the opening of the city's new stadium.

Jarre performed many of his most well-known hits at the Concert for Tolerance on Bastille Day in 1995, celebrating the 50th anniversary of the United Nations. The Eiffel Tower was specially lit for the occasion, prompting the installation of a more permanent display. The following December, he created the website "A Space for Tolerance", which featured music from En Attendant Cousteau, played while the user browsed a variety of "visual worlds".

In 1997, Jarre returned to the analogue synthesisers of the 1970s with Oxygène 7–13, dedicated to his mentor at the GRM, Pierre Schaeffer, who had died two years before. In September that year he set his fourth record for the largest-ever outdoor-concert audience with a performance at the Moscow State University, celebrating the 850th anniversary of Moscow. The event was viewed by an audience of about 3.5 million.

On September 18, 1998, during the 15th Paris Apple Expo's iMac Night, Jarre, Apple brand ambassador and friend of Steve Jobs' created the first 3D concert, Electronic Odyssee, to mark the 50th anniversary of electronic music and the launch of the Apple iMac computer. It was enjoyed by 6000 spectators wearing special 3D glasses.

Another large-scale concert followed on 31 December 1999, in the Egyptian desert near Giza. The Twelve Dreams of the Sun celebrated the new millennium and offered a preview of his next album, Métamorphoses, released in 2000. The show featured performances from more than 1,000 local artists and musicians, and was based on ancient Egyptian mythology about the journey of the Sun and its effect upon humanity. In 1998, British commercial broadcaster ITV used a remixed version of "Fourth Rendez-Vous" (called Rendez-Vous 98) for their television coverage of the 1998 FIFA World Cup in France. British group Apollo 440 were credited alongside Jarre for the remix.

=== 2000s ===
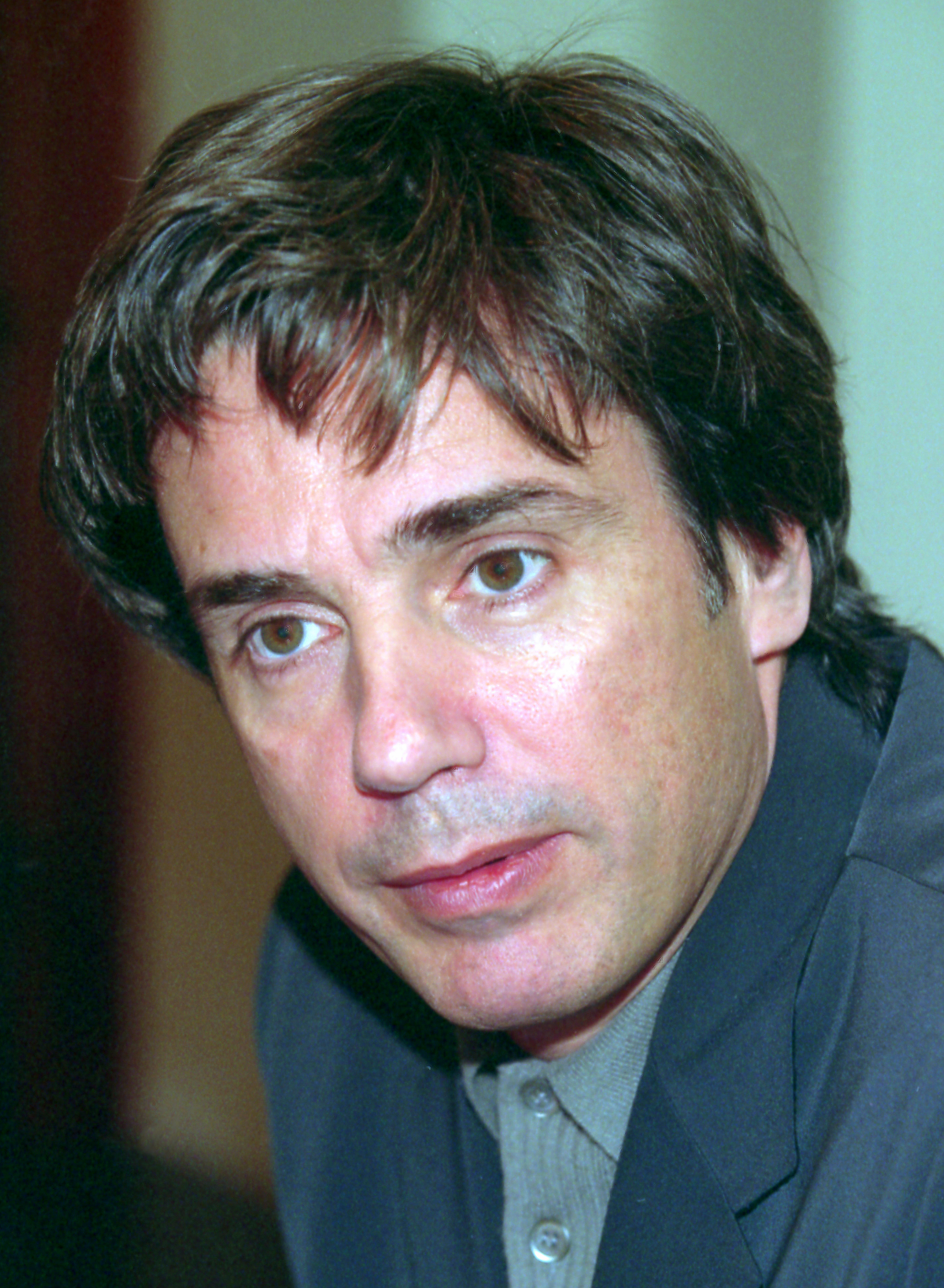
Jarre in 1999–2000

In 2001, he released Interior Music, an album of 1,000 copies created for use by the Danish audio-visual company Bang & Olufsen stores. The album consists of two long-form pieces: "Bonjour Hello", is a 25-minute audio collage of sounds with voices saying short sentences in French, English and Danish. The second piece, "Whispers of Life", is an instrumental version of the first, with the voices removed.

In 2001 he composed, with Francis Rimbert arrangements, the music for the short-lived French channel Match TV. On 7 September 2002, Jarre held a very wet and muddy concert at the Gammel Vrå Enge near the city of Aalborg in Denmark, with 40,000 spectators (including 5,000 VIPs). Danish band Safri Duo featured on the track "Aero", which in fact was Bourges 2 from the performance earlier that year, and Rendez-Vous 4. The concert was broadcast live on various TV stations around the world and a shortened one-hour version was made available for rebroadcast.

By no fault of Jarre, due to 22 millimeters of rain and lack of proper preparation for and execution of the event, it took several hours for all people to be able to leave the area, and many cars were stuck until the next day. The problems became a big issue in Danish media, since, had there been an accident, it would be extremely difficult for help to get to the location. Two years previously, nine people were killed at Roskilde Festival, which had brought focus on security at large concerts. Preparations for AERO were later proven to have been lacking, and the police investigation concluded, in part, that permission for the concert should not have been granted. Reactions from spectators were mixed, some claiming it was unsafe, and others saying it was a case of overreacting..

The show also marked a change in direction in Jarre's live concerts; from Rendez-vous Houston onwards he had been accompanied by a full complement of live musicians, but at Aalborg he was accompanied only by Francis Rimbert, and having guests like the Klarup Girls Choir, Safri Duo and the Aalborg Symphonic Orchestra.

In 2003 he released Geometry of Love on Warner Music label, it was commissioned by Jean-Roch as soundtrack for his 'V.I.P. Room' nightclub in France. The physical CD was a long time out of print, but in 2018 remastered reissue was released on CD again. The album cover is a pixelated and turned counter-clockwise photo of Jarre's girlfriend at the time, Isabelle Adjani.

In October 2004 he returned to China to open its "Year of France" cultural exchange. Jarre gave two performances, the first at the Meridian Gate of the Forbidden City, and the second in Tiananmen Square. More than 15,000 spectators watched the concert at the Meridian Gate, and each concert was transmitted nationwide on live television. Jarre collaborated with musician Chen Lin. Accompanying his traditional musical repertoire, 600 projectors shone coloured light and images across various screens and objects.

In September 2004, Jarre released both a DVD and a CD in one package AERO. A compilation album made in 5.1 surround sound, it contains re-recorded versions of some of his most famous tracks, including tracks from Oxygène and Equinoxe. Accompanying the audio, the DVD features a visual image of Anne Parillaud's eyes, recorded in real time as she listened to the album. Jarre used the minimalist imagery to reinforce the audio content of the DVD.

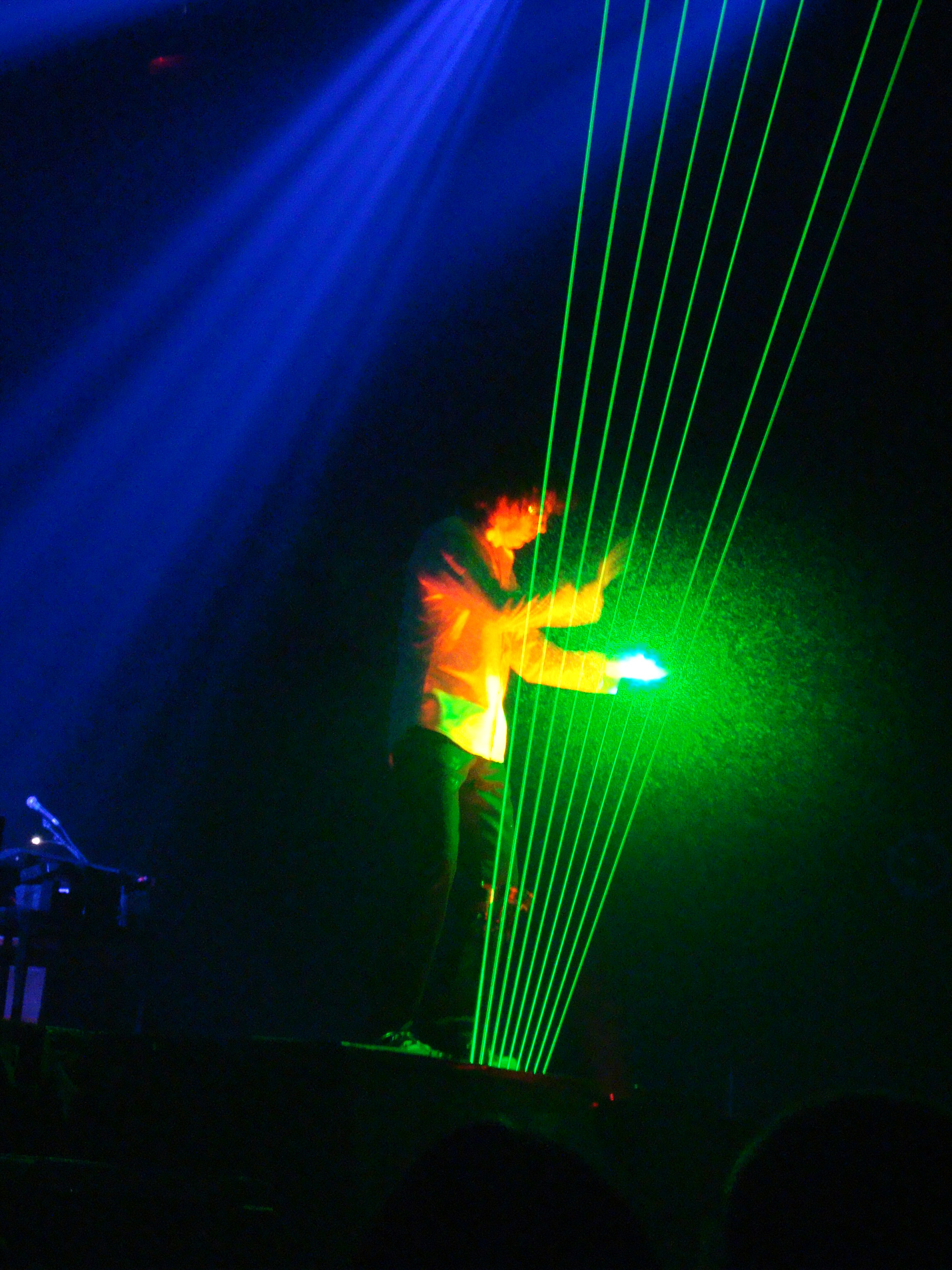
Jarre playing a laser harp, 2009

In his role of UNESCO Goodwill Ambassador, Jarre performed a concert named Water for Life in Morocco, on 16 December 2006, to celebrate the United Nations Year of Desertification in the world. The performance was in front of the Erg Chebbi Dunes of Merzouga, in the Sahara. A free event, it was attended by about 25,000 people. Images of water and the environment were projected onto nine vertical screens, held in place by sand which was watered to keep it hard. Several permanent drinking fountains were built on the site, along with a permanent electricity installation. Jarre was accompanied by over 60 Moroccan artists. Jarre released Téo & Téa in 2007, a studio album that described the different stages of a loving relationship.

In that same year released on EMI label a new recording of his 1976 album named Oxygène: New Master Recording. Jarre performed 10 concerts (Oxygène Live) in December 2007, held in the Théâtre Marigny, located in the Champs-Élysées, Paris. Later in 2008 Jarre performed several concerts to celebrate the 30th anniversary of Oxygène, in theaters in Europe. Following one such performance at the Royal Albert Hall Jarre met Queen guitarist Brian May, who proposed he create a concert in Tenerife for the International Year of Astronomy, but a lack of sponsorship meant that the concert did not take place. In 2009 he was selected as the artistic director of the World Sky Race, and also accepted a role as Goodwill Ambassador for the International Year of Astronomy. In 2009 he started an indoor tour in arenas throughout Europe.

=== 2010s ===
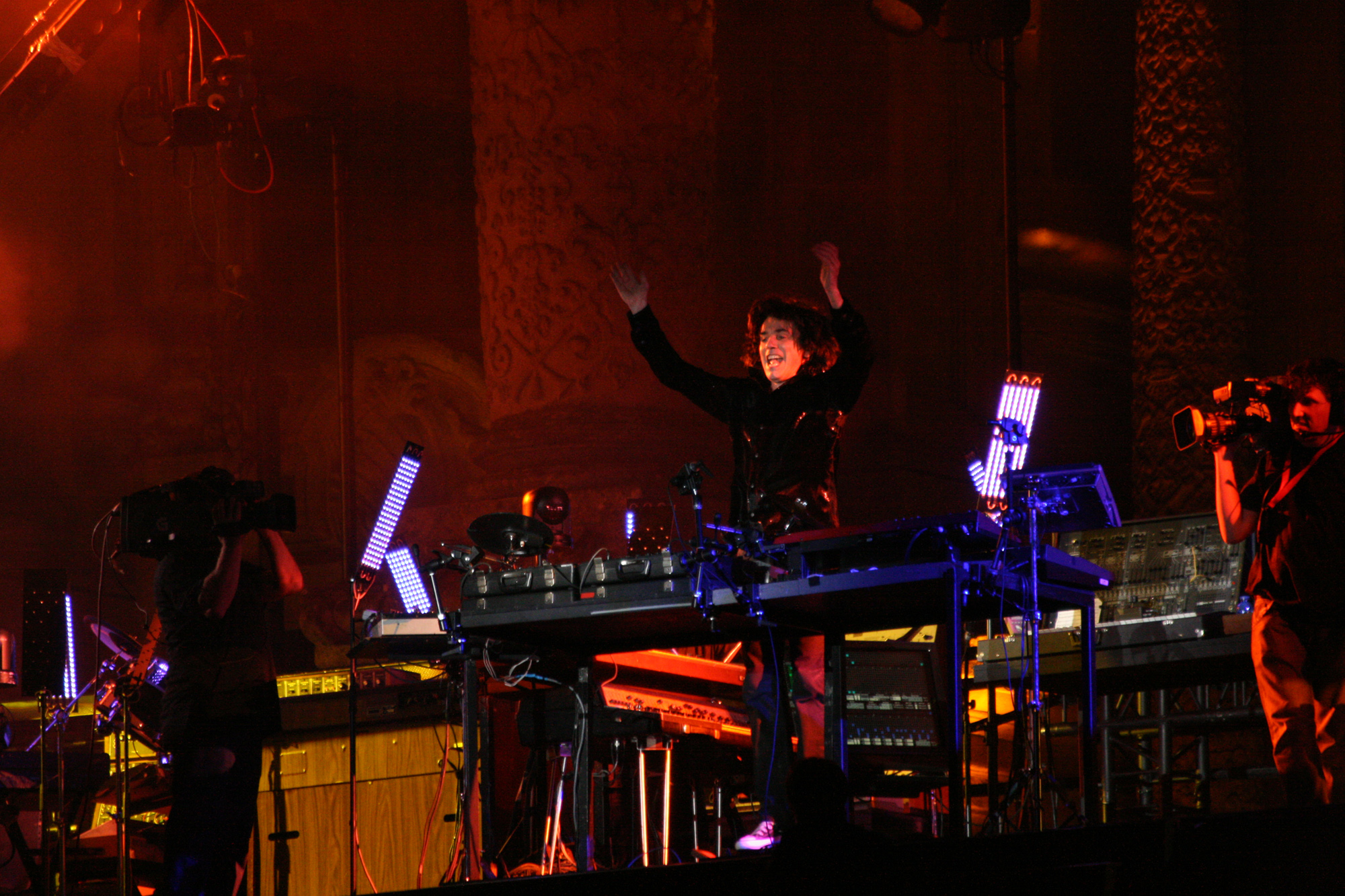
Jarre's concert in Santiago de Compostela, Galicia, Spain, July 2010

On 1 March 2010, Jean-Michel Jarre started the second leg of his 2009–2010 Indoors tour; on 10 June, he was presented with a Lifetime Achievement Award by Mojo magazine. On 1 July 2011, Jarre performed a large-scale concert in Monaco to celebrate the marriage of Prince Albert and his bride Charlene. A later concert was held at Carthage during the city's 12 August 2013 musical festival.

In June 2013, Jarre was elected as president of the Confédération Internationale des Sociétés d´Auteurs et Compositeurs (CISAC). In Spring 2015, Jarre released the first music from a new studio album, released in October 2015, following around four years of work. The album, Electronica 1: The Time Machine (working title: E-Project), comprises a number of collaborations with other artists. The first of these to be released was the collaboration with Gesaffelstein entitled Conquistador, followed by Glory, with M83. The track was also featured as part of the soundtrack of a short film entitled EMIC.

Other collaborations on the album include Tangerine Dream for Zero Gravity; Armin van Buuren for "Stardust", John Carpenter for "A Question of Blood", Little Boots for If..! and Pete Townshend for Travelator, Pt. 2. The album became Jarre's first album in over 25 years to make the UK Top 10 at No. 8. In December 2016, the album was nominated for the Grammys 2017 Awards in the "Best Dance/Electronic Album" category. In June 2015, in collaboration with Jean-Michel Jarre, the transmedia project Soundhunters was released on the platform of the Franco-German channel ARTE. The transmedia conceptualized by the Blies brothers (Stéphane Hueber-Blies and Nicolas Blies), François Le Gall and Marion Guth of the Luxembourg production company a_BAHN, is openly inspired by the album Zoolook to which it pays tribute.

On 5 October 2016, Democracy in Europe Movement 2025 announced that Jarre would be a member of its advisory panel. The transmedia is composed of a web documentary using Zoolook's creative process involving 4 international artists (Simonne Jones, Mikael Seifu, Daedelus and Luke Vibert); a 52' documentary film directed by Beryl Koltz broadcast in September 2015 on ARTE (with the participation of Chassol, Matthew Herbert, Blixa Bargeld, Jean-Michel Jarre, Matmos, Kiz, Joseph Bertolozzi); and finally a participatory tribute music album whose tracks were chosen by Jean-Michel Jarre, entitled Zoolook Revisited. Soundhunters won the Fipa d'Or 2015 in Biarritz. Soundhunters was also presented in conference at SXSW and Convergence NYFF 2016.

In 2016, Electronica 2: The Heart of Noise was released with 15 more collaborators, including Pet Shop Boys, Hans Zimmer, Yello and Gary Numan. One track (8 "Exit") includes speech by Edward Snowden. Electronica 2 has been nominated in the Album de musiques électroniques ou dance category for the Grammy 2017 in USA & Victoires de la Musique 2017 awards in France. On 11 April 2016, it was revealed that Jarre worked in collaboration with British virtual band Gorillaz on their fifth studio album Humanz. He also composed during 2016 the soundtrack for the French news network France Info. This soundtrack was released as Radiophonie Vol. 9 on 13 January 2017.

In 2017, he performed a concert near the fortress of Masada, for the purpose of saving the Dead Sea and to highlight "the anti-environmental policies of Donald Trump." He also performed a special concert for the opening of the Año Jubilar (Jubilee year) at the Monasterio de Santo Toribio de Liébana, in Spain. Both concerts were heavily based in the Electronica Tour concept. During May 2017, Jarre toured in Canada and USA for the first time in his career, and in July 2017 another leg of the tour was held in Europe.

In March 2018, Jarre performed in South America for the first time as part of his Electronica Tour in Buenos Aires and Santiago de Chile. These concerts were originally scheduled for November 2017, but problems with the production company caused the rescheduling. The 2018 leg of the tour continued in Canada and the United States during April, including the presentation of the Electronica show with a reduced track list in the Coachella Valley Music and Arts Festival, ending with a one-off concert at Riyadh to celebrate the 88th Saudi National Day (23 September). This concert was called "The Green Concert", and involved laser projections on the skyscrapers of the financial center of Riyadh. In September 2018, a studio compilation album entitled Planet Jarre – 50 Years of Music, consisting of forty-one songs in "four quite different styles of composition", was released.

On 26 November 2018, Jarre and Scott Kirkland of The Crystal Method announced that they would be collaborating on a track on Jarre's next Electronica album. In January 2019, HSBC revealed their new musical identity, composed by Jarre. On 3 October 2019, French editor Robert Laffont published Melancolique Rodeo, Jarre's autobiography. Jarre started a promotional tour for his book. On 7 November 2019, Jarre announced the release of an application for the iOS operating system named EōN. This application contains morphing graphics created by an algorithm developed by Alexis André of Sony Computer Science Laboratories, and music generated from 7 hours of recorded material by Jarre. This music is always different on every device. The AI algorithm which composes on the fly based on the rules set by Jarre was developed by BLEASS. A limited deluxe box set was later released with excerpts from the application.

=== Since 2020 ===
On 31 December 2020, Jarre held a virtual New Year's Eve concert online. He performed from a studio in Paris, but it appeared virtually from a Notre Dame setting. The show has had over 75 million viewers as of 5 January 2021. The show was done in support of his new album Welcome to the other side, which features 12 tracks from his previously released music. The recording of the concert was released on CD, LP and Blu-ray in September 2021. VR Concert created by VRROOM received 2 Webby Award Honoree, Crystal Owl Award for the Best Live Entertainment, and Social Music Award.

On 21 June 2021, Jarre was awarded Commander to the Legion of Honour by French president Emmanuel Macron at the Elysée presidential palace in Paris. After the ceremony he performed at the same venue as part of the Fête de la Musique. In March 2022 Jarre presented a live project, Oxymore, at Radio France's Hyper Weekend Festival located at Paris.

His twenty-second studio album Oxymore was released on 21 October 2022 by Sony Music and Menart Records as a tribute to Pierre Henry. Some songs were accompanied by a remix created by different artists such as Brian Eno, Nina Kraviz, Armin van Buuren, the first single from the album, "Brutalism", was released along with a remix made by Depeche Mode member Martin Gore.

OXYMORE was created as multiformat concert in VR by VRROOM Team and received Webby People's Voice Award in 2023 and Webby Nomination and Honoree in 2022, Crystal Owl Award for Best Production Design, Raindance Immersive Honourable Jury Mentioning, as well as nomination for the Producers Guild of America's Innovation Award. In July 2022, his music publishing catalog was acquired by BMG Rights Management.

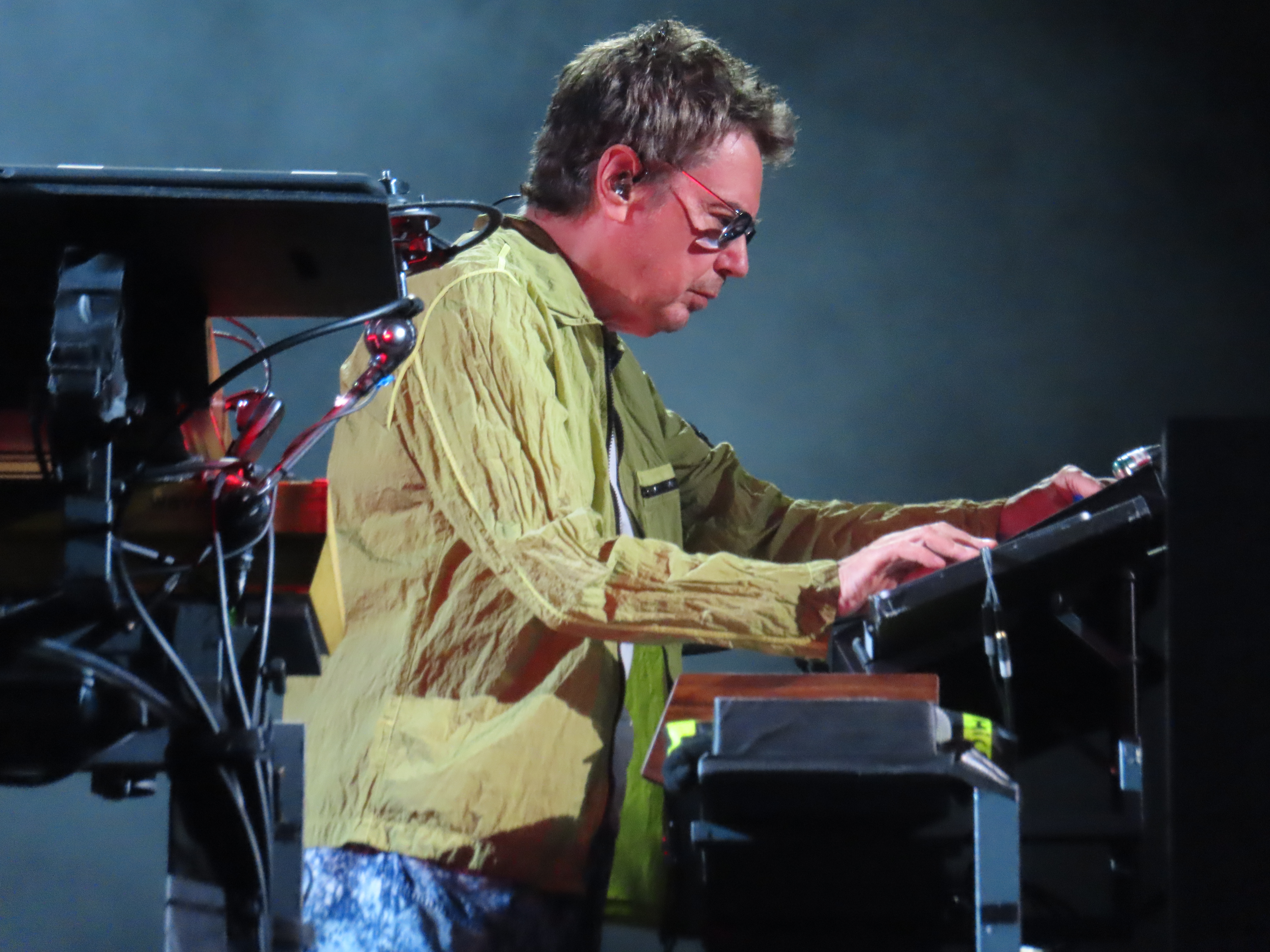
Jarre's concert in Budapest, Hungary, June 2025

On 25 December 2023, Jarre held a concert in the Hall of Mirrors of Versailles to celebrate the 400 years of the palace. This was released in October 2024 as a limited edition "phydigital" (hybrid physical and digital release) in either vinyl or CD (with a limited edition of 2000 for each format, the vinyl being numbered on the sleeve), which as well as the physical medium which provided the owner with "a truly unique digital experience," accessible by phone through a custom NFC sticker embedded inside the CD or vinyl sleeve. The digital content featured a special greeting from Jarre's avatar, exclusive behind-the-scenes photos of the event's visuals created by Jarre and his team, custom AI animations of the Hall of Mirrors, and an in-depth interview with Jarre discussing the event and its unique setup. It also included a lossless audio streaming version with an electro rendition of JB Lully's "Walk to the Turcs Ceremony," the recent single "Epica Oxygene," and fresh versions of existing tracks. In the greeting from Jarre's avatar, Jarre said that they would be updating the content twice.

In 2023 Jarre joined forces with Renault, along with Ircam and the company's sound design teams, to develop two types of sounds for the company's electric vehicles.

On 8 September 2024, Jarre performed at the closing ceremony of the 2024 Summer Paralympics.

== Flying AirCar mission ==
In April 2024, Jean-Michel Jarre became the world's first passenger to take off in Klein Vision's flying AirCar.

== Personal life ==
Jarre was married to Flore Guillard from 1975 until 1977.

He met his second wife, actress Charlotte Rampling, at a dinner party in Saint-Tropez in 1976. The two married. Jarre and Rampling separated in 1996 and divorced in 2002. Jarre gained custody of his daughter Émilie Charlotte. Rampling gained custody of her son Barnaby. Together Jarre and Rampling had a son, David.

He had a brief relationship with Isabelle Adjani, and married French actress Anne Parillaud in May 2005. In November 2010 the couple announced their divorce.

Jarre started dating Chinese actress Gong Li in 2016. They married in 2019, and have kept the relationship private.

Jarre has a half-sister, Stéphanie Jarre, from one of Maurice Jarre's other marriages. His stepbrother, Kevin Jarre, died in 2011. Although Maurice and Jean-Michel remained estranged, following Maurice's death in 2009, Jarre paid tribute to his legacy.

Jarre said about his father: "My father and I never really achieved a real relationship. We probably saw each other 20 or 25 times in our lifetime. When you are able, at my age, to count the times you have seen your father, it says something. (...) I think it's better to have conflict, or, if you have a parent who dies, you grieve, but the feeling of absence is very difficult to fill, and it took me a while to absorb that".

== Major concerts ==
Date	Audience	Place	Event	Note
14 July 1979	1 million	Place de la Concorde	celebrating Bastille Day	1st entry in the Guinness Book of Records for largest outdoor concert crowd.
5 April 1986	1.5 million	Houston	celebration of the 150th anniversary of Texas and 25th anniversary of NASA	2nd entry in the Guinness Book of Records.
5 October 1986	0.8 million	Lyon	To celebrate Pope John Paul II's visit to Jarre's hometown of Lyon.	
8, 9 October 1988	0.2 million	London	Large outdoor concert titled "Destination Docklands" performed in London's docklands.	Noted for its planning difficulties and poor weather.
14 July 1990	2.5 million	Paris la Défense	celebration of the 200th anniversary of the French Revolution 1789–1989	3rd entry in the Guinness Book of Records.
14 July 1995	1.25 million	Eiffel Tower	UNESCO's 50th birthday and UNESCO'S proclaimed year of tolerance	Originally intended to take place at Les Invalides, but changed at short notice. Was originally announced as the first of a series of Concerts For Tolerance. Only the Paris concert took place.
6 September 1997	3.5 million	Moscow	Jarre was invited for a concert celebrating the 850th birthday of Moscow	4th entry in the Guinness Book of Records (equal with Rod Stewart's 1994 Copacabana concert)
14 July 1998	0.8 million	Eiffel Tower	Bastille Day	"Electronic Night", featuring Jarre performing with numerous dance artists, playing heavily remixed versions of Jarre's music
31 December 1999	0.1 million	Giza Plateau	New Millennium	"The Twelve Dreams of the Sun", celebrating the 7th millennium of Egypt, and part of the worldwide celebrations for the year 2000.

== Honours ==
- 1976 – Grand Prix du Disque by L'Académie Charles Cros, for Oxygène
- 1976 – "Personality of The Year" by People magazine (U.S.)
- 1978 – Midem award
- 1979 – Guinness Book of Records entry for the biggest concert ever (La Concorde)
- 1981 – Honorary member of the Beijing Conservatory of Music.
- 1984 – Grand Prix du Disque by L'Académie Charles Cros, for Zoolook.
- 1985 – Instrumental album of the year, at the Victoires de la Musique in France, for Zoolook
- 1986 – Instrumental album of the year, at the Victoires de la Musique, for Rendez-vous
- 1986 – Musical spectacle of the year, at the Victoires de la Musique, for the Rendez-Vous Houston concert
- 1987 – New Guinness Book of Records entry for the biggest concert ever (Rendez-Vous Houston)
- 1987 – "European musician Person of the Year" by People magazine
- 1990 – An asteroid, 4422 Jarre, is named in his honour.
- 1990 – New Guinness Book of Records entry for the biggest concert ever (Paris La Défense: A City in Concert)
- 1993 – UNESCO Goodwill Ambassador
- 1994 – Victoire de la Musique for Chronologie.
- 1994 – Victoire de la Musique for Europe in Concert.
- 1995 – Awarded Chevalier de la Légion d'Honneur from the French Government.
- 1997 – New Guinness Book of Records entry for the biggest concert ever with 3.5 million watching at Moscow's 850th anniversary
- 1998 – IFPI's Platinum Europe Award
- 2005 – HCA Ambassador for the Hans Christian Andersen 2005 Bicentenary Festival
- 2006 – Polish Television Academy's "Super Wiktor" award for "Space of Freedom"
- 2006 – Gdańsk's Man of the Year 2005 Award
- 2007 – Eska Music Awards Special Award
- 2008 – Doctor Honoris Causa by the Mendeleev Russian University of Chemistry and Technology
- 2010 – MOJO Lifetime Achievement Award.
- 2010 – Grand Prix des Musiques Electroniques SACEM
- 2010 – Honorary citizen of Gdansk.
- 2011 – International Cavalchina Award.
- 2011 – Awarded Officier de la Légion d'Honneur from the French Government.
- 2012 – Awarded the "Miembro Honorífico del Claustro Universitario de las Artes" (Honorary Fellow of the University Senate of the Arts) by the University of Alcalá and the Society of Artists of Spain (AIE).
- 2013 – Awarded the Steiger Award in Germany.
- 2013 – Elpida Award.
- 2014 – Q Innovation of Sound award.
- 2014 – INA Distinction Numérique Award.
- 2015 – GQ Man of the Year.
- 2017 – Roland Lifetime Achievement Award.
- 2017 – SPA medal of honor.
- 2017 – Stephen Hawking Medal for Science Communication by the Starmus Festival and Stephen Hawking.
- 2018 – Honorary president of INA GRM.
- 2018 – Honorary member of Polish Authors Society Zaiks.
- 2019 - Hungarian Music Award for Best Foreign Electronic Recording (Equinoxe Infinity) (nominated)
- 2021 – Commander of the Legion of Honour by President Macron
- 2024 - Special award of the Slovak Copyright Association for contribution in the field of copyright protection

== Discography ==
Studio albums

- Deserted Palace (1972)
- Oxygène (1976)
- Equinoxe (1978)
- Les Chants Magnétiques (1981)
- Musique pour Supermarché (1983)
- Zoolook (1984)
- Rendez-Vous (1986)
- Revolutions (1988)
- En attendant Cousteau (1990)
- Chronologie (1993)
- Oxygène 7–13 (1997)
- Métamorphoses (2000)
- Sessions 2000 (2002)
- Geometry of Love (2003)
- Téo & Téa (2007)
- Oxygène: New Master Recording (2007)
- Electronica 1: The Time Machine (2015)
- Electronica 2: The Heart of Noise (2016)
- Oxygène 3 (2016)
- Equinoxe Infinity (2018)
- Amazônia (2021)
- Oxymore (2022)

== Nominations ==
- 2016: Berlin Music Video Awards, Best Editor for 'GLORY'

== See also ==
- List of ambient music artists
- List of Jean-Michel Jarre compositions with multiple titles
- List of Jean-Michel Jarre concerts
