= Space of Freedom =

2005 concert by Jean Michel Jarre in Poland

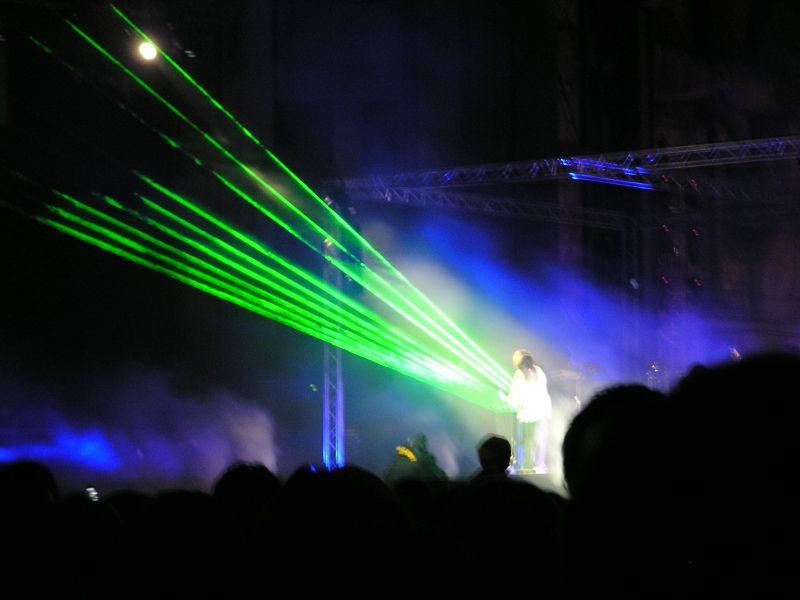
Jarre playing the laser harp

Space of Freedom was a concert performed by French musician Jean Michel Jarre in Poland, at the Gdańsk Shipyard, on August 26, 2005, to celebrate the 25th anniversary of the Solidarity trade union's foundation. Jarre was invited by Lech Wałęsa to hold this concert, which was watched by an audience of more than 170,000 people who bought tickets, as well as many others who observed the event from outside the shipyard, in high buildings such as Zieleniak and the hills of Góra Gradowa.

Lech Wałęsa, the union leader who led the strikes from 1980, and the current president of the city of Gdańsk, Paweł Adamowicz, attended the concert. Lech Wałęsa gave a speech on the meaning of Solidarity and on the non-violent upheaval of the political system.

The concert was broadcast live on Polish Television and Polish Radio, as well as by satellite. It was reproduced in commemorative books, on audio CD and DVD.

== Track listing ==
- "Waiting for Cousteau" (pre-concert warm-up)
- "Shipyard Overture" (originally "Industrial Revolution: Overture")
- "Oxygene 2" (with a new flute intro titled "Suite for Flute")
- "Chopin Memories" (new composition)
- "Aero"
- "Oxygene 4"
- "Souvenir" (originally "Souvenir of China")
- "Geometry of Love"
- "Equinoxe 4"
- "Space of Freedom" (originally "March 23")
- "Aerology"
- "Chronology 2" (with a new Theremin intro titled "Theremin Memories")
- Speech by Lech Wałęsa
- "Mury" (lit. "Walls") (composed by Jacek Kaczmarski)
- "Chronology 6"
- "Oxygene 8"
- "Light My Sky" (originally "Tout Est Bleu", new lyrics)
- "Tribute to Pope John Paul II" (originally "Akropolis")
- "Rendez-Vous 2" (version from the "Once upon a Time" performance, dedicated to Pope John Paul II)
- "Summer-Presto" (from The Four Seasons, composed by Vivaldi)
- "The Emigrant" (dedicated to Polonia)
- "Oxygene 12"
- "Rendez-Vous 4"
- "Solidarność" (originally "Oxygène 13", dedicated to the workers at the shipyard)
- "Aerology Remix" (encore)

== Musicians ==
- Jean Michel Jarre (keyboards, mixing desk, laser harp, theremin, vocals)
- Francis Rimbert (keyboards, electronic percussions)
- Claude Samard (keyboards, guitars, musical coordinator)
- Patrick Rondat (electric guitar on "Chronology 2" and Vivaldi "Summer Presto")
- Baltic Philharmonic Orchestra
- Gdansk University Choir

== Published media ==
- Book: Jarre, Jean Michel. Przestrzeń Wolności, 2005. ISBN 83-915166-9-5.
- Audio CD: Live From Gdańsk (Koncert w Stoczni) (2005, released exclusively in Central Europe).
- DVD: Jean-Michel Jarre: Solidarnosc Live (2005, NTSC, one disc, also released as a "Collector's Edition" with the audio CD).
