= Jacek Kaczmarski discography =

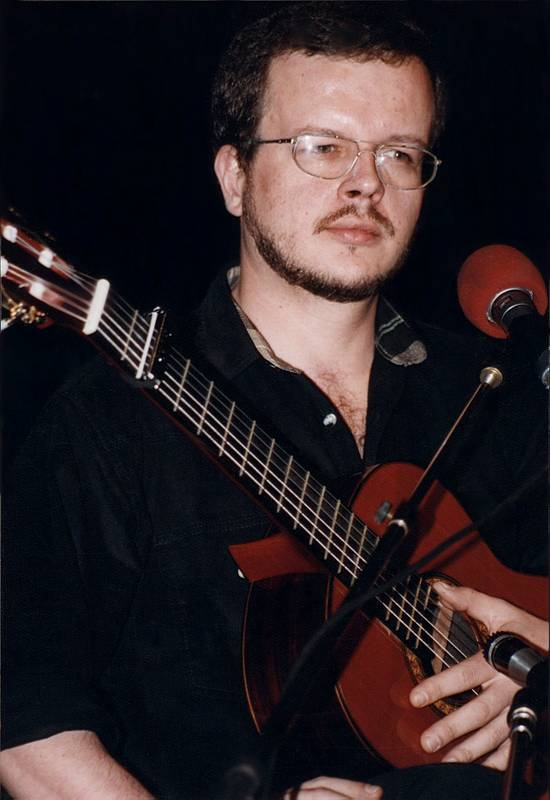
- Jacek Kaczmarski (1992)
- Studio albums: 12
- EPs: 1
- Live albums: 14
- Compilation albums: 5
- Singles: 10
- Video albums: 1

Jacek Kaczmarski's discography includes 11 studio albums, 12 live albums, and 2 compilation albums during his lifetime. After his death, it expanded to include 5 box sets, 1 studio album, 1 live album, 3 compilations, and a five-disc DVD album.

Jacek Kaczmarski, over the course of his uninterrupted 25-year artistic career (1976–2001), left behind many recordings. Those published during his lifetime were collected in the box set Syn marnotrawny (except for Koncert ’97), which the artist himself oversaw during its production. However, most recordings were released only after his death, often in the form of compilation box sets (Suplement, Mała Arka Noego, Arka Noego, Ze sceny), as well as previously unpublished individual albums – Świadectwo, Encore, jeszcze raz – and as DVDs, such as Scena to dziwna... 1980–2001. His discography also includes numerous compilations that continue to be released to this day.

== Single Releases ==
=== Programs and Albums ===
==== Albums recorded with Przemysław Gintrowski and Zbigniew Łapiński ====
Year of Recording	Year of First Official Release	Title	Publisher	Type of Album	Notes
1980	1981	Mury	Wifon	Studio	The first studio album recorded with Przemysław Gintrowski and Zbigniew Łapiński.
1980	1991	Raj	Pomaton EMI	Live	A program from 1980 that was never professionally recorded. Officially released in 1991 from the best-preserved semi-professional sources.
1981	1991	Muzeum	Pomaton EMI	Live	A program from 1981 that was never professionally recorded. Officially released in 1991 from the best-preserved semi-professional sources.
1991	1991	Mury w Muzeum Raju	Pomaton EMI	Live	A recording from the Trio's (i.e., Kaczmarski, Gintrowski and Lapinski) first concert tour after Kaczmarski's return from exile. The album consists of songs sung 10 years earlier.
1993	1993	Wojna postu z karnawałem	Pomaton EMI	Studio	The first and last new program by the Trio after years of absence.

==== Albums Recorded with Zbigniew Łapiński ====
Year of Recording	Year of First Official Release	Title	Publisher	Type of Album	Notes
1981	1989	Krzyk	Polskie Nagrania	Studio	The album was recorded in 1981, but after the introduction of martial law, the entire stock was destroyed. However, the master tape survived, allowing its original version to be released in 1989.
1990	1991	Live	Pomaton EMI	Live	An album released after the first concert tour in Poland following Kaczmarski's return from exile, which achieved diamond record status in 2002.
1994	1994	Sarmatia	Pomaton EMI	Studio	A program thematically connected to the history of Poland during the times of the Polish-Lithuanian Commonwealth (16th–17th centuries).
1994	1995	Szukamy stajenki	Pomaton EMI	Live	Christmas carols and pastorals written jointly by Kaczmarski and Łapiński, recorded with guest appearances by Elżbieta Adamiak.

==== Solo Albums ====
Year of Recording	Year of First Official Release	Title	Publisher	Type of Album	Notes
1982	1982	Carmagnole 1981	Stentor Studio Pomaton EMI	Studio	Kaczmarski's first solo album, released in exile in West Germany. The Polish edition was only released in 2004 as part of the Syn marnotrawny box set on CD.
1982	1982	Strącanie aniołów	Safran 78 Pomaton EMI	Live	A live vinyl album released in Sweden. The Polish edition was released in 2004 as part of the Syn marnotrawny box set on CD.
1983	1983	Chicago Live ‘83	Pomost Pomaton EMI	Live	A double album released on vinyl in the USA. The Polish edition was released in 2004 as part of the Syn marnotrawny box set on CD.
1986	1986	Litania	Iron Curtain Records Pomaton EMI	Studio	Recorded in Australia with accompanying musicians. The Polish edition was released in 2004 as part of the Syn marnotrawny box set on CD.
1987	1991	Kosmopolak	Pomaton EMI	Studio	The first album recorded at Radio Free Europe in Munich in 1987.
1989	1991	Dzieci Hioba	Pomaton EMI	Studio	Recorded at Radio Free Europe in Munich in 1989.
1990	1991	Głupi Jasio	Pomaton EMI	Studio	Besides songs, it includes poems recited by Stanisław Elsner Załuski. Recorded at Radio Free Europe in Munich in 1990.
1992	1992	Bankiet	Pomaton EMI	Live	A unique album in Kaczmarski's discography, consisting of songs performed in "unofficial" social circumstances. It also includes songs by Władimir Wysocki and Stanisław Staszewski.
1996	1997	Pochwała łotrostwa	Pomaton EMI	Studio	The last program written before his emigration to Australia, and the last studio album released during his lifetime. Only guitar accompaniment was used in the recordings.
1998	1998	Między nami	Pomaton EMI	Studio	Songs from the program were written in Australia and arranged for a band by Janusz Strobel.
1997	1998	Koncert ‘97	Scutum J.C. Koncert	Live	A recording from a concert tour after Kaczmarski's first return to Poland from Australia in 1997. The album was re-released in 2008 under the new title Trasa koncertowa '97.
1999	2000	Dwie skały	Polskie Radio	Live	The second program written in Australia and also the first album by the artist released by Polskie Radio.
2000	2001	Dwadzieścia (5) lat później	Polskie Radio	Live	An album released to commemorate the 20th anniversary of the formation of "Solidarity" and the 25th anniversary of Kaczmarski's artistic career.
2001	2002	Mimochodem	Polskie Radio	Live	Kaczmarski's final program.
2000	2006	Świadectwo	J.C. Koncert	Studio	Posthumous release. In 2000, Kaczmarski recorded studio versions of his most well-known songs and some rarely performed in concerts.
2001	2012	Encore, jeszcze raz (Paryż 2001)	Licomp Empik Multimedia	Live	Posthumous release. The album was issued in celebration of the poet's 55th birthday in 2012. The recorded concert took place on July 24, 2001, in Arcueil near Paris.

=== Compilations ===
==== Złota kolekcja: Jacek Kaczmarski – Źródło (2003) ====
This compilation consists of well-known performances of songs from Kaczmarski's earlier albums. It also includes two previously unpublished performances from the early 1980s.

Releases:

- 2003 – Pomaton EMI (cassette, CD, catalog no. 5835304, 5835302)

No.	Title	Album/Source	Duration
1.	"O krok..."	Między nami	01:57
2.	"Obława"	Studio Gama (1980, previously unpublished performance) Performed by: J. Kaczmarski – vocals, guitar; P. Gintrowski – vocals, guitar	02:44
3.	"Nie lubię"	Krzyk	01:49
4.	"Między nami"	Między nami	04:35
5.	"Piosenka napisana mimochodem"	Mimochodem	03:03
6.	"Źródło"	Mury	04:27
7.	"Nasza klasa"	Live	04:18
8.	"Postmodernizm"	Między nami	02:07
9.	"Wojna postu z karnawałem"	Wojna postu z karnawałem	02:40
10.	"Przyczynek do legendy o św. Jerzym"	Między nami	02:24
11.	"Lekcja historii klasycznej"	Krzyk	02:42
12.	"Ballada wrześniowa"	Dwadzieścia (5) lat później	02:17
13.	Sen Katarzyny II	Krzyk	02:01
14.	"Krajobraz po uczcie"	Mury w Muzeum Raju	02:52
15.	"Zesłanie studentów"	Mury w Muzeum Raju	04:02
16.	"Modlitwa"	Dzieci Hioba	02:08
17.	"Zegar"	Między nami	02:18
18.	"Bajka o Głupim Jasiu"	Live	04:47
19.	"Wędrówka z cieniem"	Dwadzieścia (5) lat później	03:15
20.	"Pożegnanie Okudżawy"	Między nami	04:14
21.	"Epitafium dla Włodzimierza Wysockiego"	Recording from 19th National Festival of Polish Song – Opole '81 (previously unpublished)	08:08
22.	"Mury"	Mury w Muzeum Raju	05:10

==== Złota kolekcja: Jacek Kaczmarski – Źródło & Wyschnięte strumienie (2012) ====
A two-disc, expanded version of the compilation released in 2003.

Releases:

- 2012 – EMI Music Poland (2 CDs)

No.	Title	Album/Source	Duration
Volume 1 – Źródło
1.	"O krok..."	Między nami	01:57
2.	"Obława"	Studio Gama (1980, previously unpublished performance) Performed by: J. Kaczmarski – vocals, guitar; P. Gintrowski – vocals, guitar	02:44
3.	"Nie lubię"	Krzyk	01:49
4.	"Między nami"	Między nami	04:35
5.	"Piosenka napisana mimochodem"	Mimochodem	03:03
6.	"Źródło"	Mury	04:27
7.	"Nasza klasa"	Live	04:18
8.	"Postmodernizm"	Między nami	02:07
9.	"Wojna postu z karnawałem"	Wojna postu z karnawałem	02:40
10.	"Przyczynek do legendy o św. Jerzym"	Między nami	02:24
11.	"Lekcja historii klasycznej"	Krzyk	02:42
12.	"Ballada wrześniowa"	Dwadzieścia (5) lat później	02:17
13.	Sen Katarzyny II	Krzyk	02:01
14.	"Krajobraz po uczcie"	Mury w Muzeum Raju	02:52
15.	"Zesłanie studentów"	Mury w Muzeum Raju	04:02
16.	"Modlitwa"	Dzieci Hioba	02:08
17.	"Zegar"	Między nami	02:18
18.	"Bajka o Głupim Jasiu"	Live	04:47
19.	"Wędrówka z cieniem"	Dwadzieścia (5) lat później	03:15
20.	"Pożegnanie Okudżawy"	Między nami	04:14
21.	"Epitafium dla Włodzimierza Wysockiego"	Recording from 19th National Festival of Polish Song – Opole '81 (previously unpublished)	08:08
22.	"Mury"	Mury w Muzeum Raju	05:10
Volume 2 – Wyschnięte strumienie
1.	"Wiatr"	Suplement – Radio Wolna Europa vol. 1	01:45
2.	"Samobójstwo Jesienina"	Suplement – Radio Wolna Europa vol. 2	02:55
3.	"Przyjaciele"	Chicago Live ’83	01:36
4.	"Artyści"	Chicago Live ’83	02:41
5.	"Kara Barabasza"	Live	03:34
6.	"Antylitania na czasy przejściowe"	Wojna postu z karnawałem	02:42
7.	"Starość Owidiusza"	Kosmopolak	03:09
8.	"Ambasadorowie"	Kosmopolak	02:45
9.	"Martwa natura"	Suplement – Radio Wolna Europa vol. 1	01:50
10.	"Portret zbiorowy we wnętrzu – Dom Opieki"	Wojna postu z karnawałem	04:05
11.	"Marcin Luter"	Wojna postu z karnawałem	03:17
12.	"Katyń"	Live	04:29
13.	"Barykada (Śmierć Baczyńskiego)"	Live	03:16
14.	"Jałta"	Live	04:30
15.	"Wyschnięte strumienie"	Między nami	01:48
16.	"Krzyk"	Krzyk	01:50
17.	"Autoportret z psem"	Mała Arka Noego – Między nami (live)	02:01
18.	"Ogłoszenie w kosmos (Stanisławowi Lemowi)"	Pochwała łotrostwa	01:15
19.	"Śniadanie z Bogiem"	Dwie skały	04:43
20.	"Sąd nad Goyą"	Dwie skały	04:49
21.	"Przepowiednia Jana Chrzciciela"	Mimochodem	04:53
22.	"Jan Kochanowski"	Ze sceny – Wojna postu z karnawałem – "Riviera". Część 2	04:57
23.	"Bob Dylan"	Bankiet	04:40
24.	"Ilu nas w ciszy..."	Szukamy stajenki	03:44

In 2017, this version was shortened for music streaming services (Spotify, Tidal etc.).

No.	Title	Album/Source	Duration
1.	"O krok..."	Między nami	01:57
2.	"Nie lubię"	Krzyk	01:49
3.	"Między nami"	Między nami	04:35
4.	"Nasza klasa"	Live	04:18
5.	"Postmodernizm"	Między nami	02:07
6.	"Wojna postu z karnawałem"	Wojna postu z karnawałem	02:40
7.	"Przyczynek do legendy o św. Jerzym"	Między nami	02:24
8.	"Krajobraz po uczcie"	Mury w Muzeum Raju	02:52
9.	"Zesłanie studentów"	Mury w Muzeum Raju	04:02
10.	"Modlitwa"	Dzieci Hioba	02:08
11.	"Zegar"	Między nami	02:18
12.	"Bajka o Głupim Jasiu"	Live	04:47
13.	"Pożegnanie Okudżawy"	Między nami	04:14
14.	"Mury"	Mury w Muzeum Raju	05:10
15.	"Kara Barabasza"	Live	03:34
16.	"Antylitania na czasy przejściowe"	Wojna postu z karnawałem	02:42
17.	"Starość Owidiusza"	Kosmopolak	03:09
18.	"Ambasadorowie"	Kosmopolak	02:45
19.	"Portret zbiorowy w zabytkowym wnętrzu"	Wojna postu z karnawałem	04:05
20.	"Marcin Luter"	Wojna postu z karnawałem	03:17
21.	"Katyń"	Live	04:29
22.	"Barykada (Śmierć Baczyńskiego)"	Live	03:16
23.	"Autoportret z psem"	Mała Arka Noego – Między nami (live)	02:01
24.	"Ogłoszenie w kosmos (Stanisławowi Lemowi)"	Pochwała łotrostwa	01:15
25.	"Jan Kochanowski"	Ze sceny – Wojna postu z karnawałem – "Riviera". Część 2	04:57

==== Złota kolekcja: Gintrowski, Kaczmarski, Łapiński – Pokolenie (2003) ====
A compilation of works created by the famous Trio – Przemysław Gintrowski, Jacek Kaczmarski, and Zbigniew Łapiński.

Releases:

- 2003 – Pomaton EMI (cassette, CD, catalog no. 5963884, 5963882)

No.	Title	Album/Source	Duration
1.	"Mury"	Mury	04:28
2.	"Modlitwa o wschodzie słońca"	Mury w Muzeum Raju	02:42
3.	"Wojna postu z karnawałem"	Wojna postu z karnawałem	02:42
4.	"Antylitania na czasy przejściowe"	Wojna postu z karnawałem	02:42
5.	"Przyjaciele, których nie miałem"	Mury	03:26
6.	"Pokolenie"	Mury w Muzeum Raju	02:21
7.	"Rozmowa"	Wojna postu z karnawałem	03:44
8.	"Karmaniola"	Mury w Muzeum Raju	02:28
9.	"Pejzaż z szubienicą"	Mury	03:42
10.	"Strącanie aniołów"	Mury w Muzeum Raju	02:15
11.	"Hymn"	Raj	02:31
12.	"Dziady"	Mury	02:59
13.	"Wieża Babel"	Raj	03:19
14.	"Arka Noego"	Mury w Muzeum Raju	03:19
15.	"Rzeź niewiniątek"	Mury w Muzeum Raju	02:09
16.	"Śmiech"	Mury	03:55
17.	"Zatruta studnia"	Muzeum	04:08
18.	"Wigilia na Syberii"	Mury w Muzeum Raju	05:20
19.	"Kantyczka z lotu ptaka"	Wojna postu z karnawałem	05:31
20.	"Powrót"	Pamiątki	05:30
21.	"Mur"	Mury	02:03

==== In Memoriam (2014) ====
This two-disc compilation was released to commemorate the 10th anniversary of Jacek Kaczmarski's death by the Music Agency of Polish Radio.

The first disc, Sen kochającego psa, contains songs from the later period of the artist's career (mainly from the albums Dwie skały and Mimochodem). The second disc, Koncert na XX-lecie, features a selection of songs from one of his best concerts, recorded on December 11, 1996, for Polish Radio at the Riviera Auditorium in Warsaw, celebrating the 20th anniversary of Kaczmarski's artistic career. This performance was especially unique, as it took place in the same hall where the artist began his career 20 years earlier. The concert, with its well-curated repertoire and outstanding performance, was described by critics and audiences as a remarkable event.

Two years earlier, a full recording of the concert was released as part of the box set Ze sceny by Warner Music Poland.

Releases:

- 2014 – Polskie Radio (2 CDs, catalog no. 14681028)

No.	Title	Album/Source	Duration
Volume 1 – Sen kochającego psa
1.	"Między nami"	Mała Arka Noego – Między nami (live)	04:11
2.	"Piosenka napisana mimochodem"	Mimochodem	03:19
3.	Zapowiedź	Mimochodem	00:51
4.	"Sen kochającego psa"	Mimochodem	02:38
5.	Zapowiedź	Mimochodem	01:25
6.	"Coś Ty (Zaloty)"	Mimochodem	02:11
7.	"Landszaft z kroplą krwi"	Mimochodem	03:23
8.	"Portret płonący"	Mimochodem	02:25
9.	"Legenda o miłości"	Mimochodem	04:26
10.	"Wyznanie kalifa, czyli o mocy baśni"	Dwie skały	04:18
11.	"Księżniczka i Pirat"	Dwie skały	03:58
12.	"Romantyczność (Do sztambucha)"	Dwie skały	02:49
13.	"Czerwcowy wicher przy kominku"	Dwie skały	02:33
14.	"Przy ołtarzu baru"	Dwie skały	02:38
15.	"Mucha w szklance lemoniady"	Dwie skały	06:02
16.	"Przechadzka z Orfeuszem"	Mała Arka Noego – Między nami (live)	04:39
17.	"Pytania retoryczne"	Mała Arka Noego – Między nami (live)	02:53
18.	"Wędrówka z cieniem"	Dwadzieścia (5) lat później	03:14
19.	"Źródło"	Recording from the concern session of the album Dwadzieścia (5) lat później, The session took place on December 22, 2000, at the Piwnica pod Harendą in Warsaw.	04:11
Volume 2 – Koncert na XX-lecie (fragmenty)
1.	Zapowiedź koncertu	Ze sceny – Koncert na XX-lecie. Część 1	02:08
2.	"Nie lubię (wg Wysockiego)"	Ze sceny – Koncert na XX-lecie. Część 1	02:06
3.	"Przedszkole"	Ze sceny – Koncert na XX-lecie. Część 1	02:48
4.	"Nasza klasa"	Ze sceny – Koncert na XX-lecie. Część 1	04:07
5.	"Encore, jeszcze raz"	Ze sceny – Koncert na XX-lecie. Część 1	05:12
6.	"Krajobraz po uczcie"	Ze sceny – Koncert na XX-lecie. Część 1	03:17
7.	Sen Katarzyny II	Ze sceny – Koncert na XX-lecie. Część 1	02:53
8.	"Przejście Polaków przez Morze Czerwone"	Ze sceny – Koncert na XX-lecie. Część 1	03:44
9.	"Tradycja"	Ze sceny – Koncert na XX-lecie. Część 1	02:23
10.	"Wojna postu z karnawałem"	Ze sceny – Koncert na XX-lecie. Część 1	02:41
11.	"Jan Kochanowski"	Ze sceny – Koncert na XX-lecie. Część 1	05:03
12.	"Niech…"	Ze sceny – Koncert na XX-lecie. Część 1	05:15
13.	"Obława"	Ze sceny – Koncert na XX-lecie. Część 2	02:54
14.	"Obława II (z helikopterów)"	Ze sceny – Koncert na XX-lecie. Część 2	02:36
15.	"Obława III (Potrzask)"	Ze sceny – Koncert na XX-lecie. Część 2	02:43
16.	"Przeczucie (Cztery pory niepokoju)"	Ze sceny – Koncert na XX-lecie. Część 2	03:18
17.	"Rublow"	Ze sceny – Koncert na XX-lecie. Część 2	05:27
18.	"Zbroja"	Ze sceny – Koncert na XX-lecie. Część 2	05:09
19.	"Konfesjonał"	Ze sceny – Koncert na XX-lecie. Część 2	03:50
20.	"Epitafium dla Włodzimierza Wysockiego"	Ze sceny – Koncert na XX-lecie. Część 2	10:05

==== Gintrowski, Kaczmarski, Łapiński – Niepodlegli (2018) ====
This three-disc album, featuring songs by the legendary Trio, was specially prepared to commemorate the 100th anniversary of Poland regaining independence. The selection of songs was made to guide the listener through the events from the partitions of Poland to the country's independence in 1989 and the early years of freedom.

Wydania:

- 2018 – Polskie Radio (3 CDs, catalog no. PRCD 2201-2203)

No.	Title	Album/Source	Duration
CD1
1.	"Modlitwa o wschodzie słońca"	Mury w Muzeum Raju	02:42
2.	"Rejtan, czyli raport ambasadora"	Strącanie aniołów	02:44
3.	"Krajobraz po uczcie"	Mury	03:05
4.	"Ostatnia mapa Polski"	Mała Arka Noego – Kwadranse Jacka Kaczmarskiego IV	01:52
5.	"Requiem rozbiorowe"	Suplement – Rarytasy i niespodzianki	11:44
6.	"Zesłanie studentów"	Mury w Muzeum Raju	04:07
7.	"Wigilia na Syberii"	Pamiątki	04:56
8.	"Powrót z Syberii"	Muzeum	03:21
9.	"Starość Piotra Wysockiego"	Krzyk	01:28
10.	"Karol Levittoux"	Kamienie	05:17
11.	"Margrabia Wielopolski"	Kamienie	03:58
12.	"Pikieta powstańcza"	Kanapka z człowiekiem i trzy zapomniane piosenki	04:05
13.	"Wiosna 1905"	Mury w Muzeum Raju	03:09
14.	"17 IX"	Tren	02:51
15.	"Autoportret Witkacego"	Recording from the 19th National Festival of Polish Song – Opole '81 (Previously unpublished performance)	04:37
16.	"Ballada wrześniowa"	Live	02:17
17.	"Rozbite oddziały"	Kosmopolak	02:34
18.	"Katyń"	Live	04:29
19.	"Guziki"	Tren	03:01
20.	"Rozstrzelanie"	Muzeum	01:22
21.	"Birkenau"	Kanapka z człowiekiem i trzy zapomniane piosenki	06:18
CD2
1.	"Jałta"	Litania	03:40
2.	"Dylemat"	Pamiątki	02:06
3.	"Barykada (Śmierć Baczyńskiego)"	Live	03:16
4.	"Czołg"	Kosmopolak	01:35
5.	"Targ"	Pamiątki	02:11
6.	"Potęga smaku"	Pamiątki	03:02
7.	"Przypowieść prawdziwa o szaliku"	Suplement – Radio Wolna Europa vol. 2	02:15
8.	"Świadkowie"	I Przegląd Piosenki Prawdziwej	04:18
9.	"Wilki"	Tren	02:23
10.	"Ballada o bieli"	Kosmopolak	02:26
11.	"Czerwony autobus"	Pamiątki	01:51
12.	"Doświadczenie (Marzec '68)"	Głupi Jasio	03:12
13.	"Opowieść pewnego emigranta"	Kosmopolak	02:44
14.	"Młodych Niemców sen"	Suplement – Radio Wrocław	02:36
15.	"Manewry"	Ze sceny – Złota płyta "Krzyk"	02:43
16.	"Ballada o powitaniu"	Carmagnole 1981	01:50
17.	"Ballada o ubocznych skutkach alkoholizmu"	Bankiet	05:27
18.	"Przejście Polaków przez Morze Czerwone"	Ze sceny – Koncert na XX-lecie. Część 1	03:44
19.	"Dwie rozmowy z Kremlem (1981/1989)"	Głupi Jasio	05:19
20.	"Koncert fortepianowy"	Chicago Live ’83	02:16
21.	"A my nie chcemy uciekać stąd"	Pamiątki	03:23
22.	"ZOMO. Spokój. Bies"	Raport z oblężonego miasta	02:36
23.	"Prośba"	Dwadzieścia (5) lat później	02:54
24.	"Kołysanka"	Mała Arka Noego – Zbroja	03:29
25.	"Górnicy" (Lyrics by Tomasz Jastrun, music by Przemysław Gintrowski)	Raport z oblężonego miasta	01:44
26.	"Górnicy" (Lyrics and music by Jacek Kaczmarski, arrangement by Anthony Milosz)	Mała Arka Noego – Kwadranse Jacka Kaczmarskiego I	02:06
27.	"Gdy tak siedzimy"	Raport z oblężonego miasta	02:07
28.	"Odpowiedź"	Raport z oblężonego miasta	04:14
CD3
1.	"Nasza klasa"	Ze sceny – Koncert na XX-lecie. Część 1	04:03
2.	"List"	Kanapka z człowiekiem i trzy zapomniane piosenki	03:55
3.	"Artyści"	Mała Arka Noego – Zbroja	03:16
4.	"Świadectwo"	Ze sceny – Koncert na XX-lecie. Część 1	01:37
5.	"Patriotyzm"	Suplement – Radio Wolna Europa vol. 2	02:11
6.	"Powrót sentymentalnej panny S."	Live	03:02
7.	"Ballada paranoika"	Suplement – Radio Wrocław	00:54
8.	"Pochwała"	Dzieci Hioba	01:38
9.	"Z chłopa – król"	Głupi Jasio	03:02
10.	"Kariera Nikodema Dyzmy"	Suplement – Radio Wrocław	02:26
11.	"Ulotka wyborcza"	Suplement – Radio Wolna Europa vol. 3	02:00
12.	"Lament"	Dzieci Hioba	02:12
13.	"Amanci panny S."	Pochwała łotrostwa	02:45
14.	"Bieszczady"	Dzieci Hioba	02:34
15.	"Kiedy"	Suplement – Radio Wolna Europa vol. 3	02:18
16.	"Pięć sonetów o umieraniu komunizmu"	Suplement – Radio Wolna Europa vol. 3	05:08
17.	"Rehabilitacja komunistów"	Kosmopolak	01:47
18.	"Wróżba"	Raport z oblężonego miasta	02:54
19.	"Wywiad z emerytem"	Suplement – Radio Wolna Europa vol. 2	02:31
20.	"Zwątpienie"	Głupi Jasio	03:15
21.	"Nasza klasa '92"	Ze sceny – Koncert na XX-lecie. Część 1	03:16
22.	"Litania"	Mała Arka Noego – Kwadranse Jacka Kaczmarskiego I	02:18
23.	"Postmodernizm"	Mała Arka Noego – Między nami (live)	02:00
24.	"Bajka"	Kosmopolak	03:28
25.	"Kantyczka z lotu ptaka"	Kanapka z człowiekiem i trzy zapomniane piosenki	06:04
26.	"Mury"	Mury	02:06
27.	"Modlitwa"	Dzieci Hioba	02:08

==== Płyta promocyjna – Pomaton 1997 ====
This CD also contains individual tracks by Studia Buffo, Bolec and Graża T.

Releases:

- 1997 – Pomaton EMI (CD, catalog no. Promo CD 051)

No.	Title	Album/Source	Duration
1.	Jacek Kaczmarski	"Pochwała łotrostwa"	03:47

==== Między nami – płyta promocyjna (1998) ====
A selection of songs from the album Między nami, distributed exclusively to radio stations.

Releases:

- 1998 – Pomaton EMI (CD, catalog no. Promo CD 115)

No.	Title	Duration
1.	"Między nami"	04:35
2.	"Postmodernizm"	02:07
3.	"Rytmy"	03:42
4.	"Pytania retoryczne"	02:54

==== Ilu nas w ciszy... (1998) ====
A CD featuring a selection of songs from the program Szukamy stajenki, previously released on cassette.

Releases:

- 1998 – Scutum (CD, catalog no. SCD003)

Words and Music: Jacek Kaczmarski

No.	Title	Duration
1.	"Szukamy stajenki (W deszczu gwiazd...)"	02:23
2.	"Odmiennych mową, wiarą, obyczajem..."	03:33
3.	"Nad uśpioną Galileą..."	03:00
4.	"Lśnij, nieboskłonie..."	04:48
5.	"Ilu nas w ciszy..."	03:44

=== Commemorative Albums ===
==== La source – Źródło (1981) ====
A vinyl album released in France in 1981, with proceeds going to support Solidarity.

No.	Performer	Title
1.	Jacek Kaczmarski	"Źródło"
2.	J.F. Dupont, J.M. Trassart	"L’Aigle, l’ours et les corbeaux"

==== Pom Info ’99 ====
This album was released for the 4th Conference of Pomaton EMI Contractors, held on October 2, 1999, in Warsaw. In addition to the track "Mury," it includes a selection of Polish and international artists published by Pomaton EMI.

Releases:

- 1999 – Pomaton EMI (CD)

No.	Performer	Title
18.	Jacek Kaczmarski, Przemysław Gintrowski, Zbigniew Łapiński	"Mury"

==== Dzięki którym powstaliśmy i przetrwaliśmy (2006) ====
Released for the 25th anniversary of the first congress of NSZZ "Solidarity" Region Mazowsze. The anniversary celebrations took place in June 2006 in Warsaw. The album also includes songs by Jan Krzysztof Kelus.

Releases:

- 2006 – Stefan Batory Foundation, NSZZ "Solidarity"

No.	Performer	Title
4.	Jacek Kaczmarski	"Przejście Polaków przez Morze Czerwone"
7.	Jacek Kaczmarski	"Świadectwo"
9.	Jacek Kaczmarski	"Powrót sentymentalnej panny S."
10.	Jacek Kaczmarski	"Nasza klasa ’92"

=== Albums Included with Newspapers and Books ===
==== Życie Warszawy: Pomóżmy Jackowi Kaczmarskiemu (2002) ====
A CD included with Życia Warszawy on May 9, 2002, featuring three tracks from the album Świadectwo, which was released later in 2006.

Words and Music: Jacek Kaczmarski

No.	Title	Duration
1.	"Korespondencja klasowa"	09:02
2.	"Nasza klasa"	03:50
3.	"Obława"	02:39

==== Ale źródło wciąż bije... (2002) ====
This CD was included with the anthology of Jacek Kaczmarski's poetry of the same title. Tracks 1–5 come from a recording session at the Large Studio of Radio Wrocław (June 28 – July 4, 2001), and track 6 comes from a concert at Kraków's Rotunda in October 1999.

Releases:

- 2002 – Volumen Marabut

Performers:

- Jacek Kaczmarski – vocals, guitar (1–6)
- Przemysław Gintrowski – vocals, guitar (6)
- Zbigniew Łapiński – vocals, piano (6)

Lyrics:

- Jacek Kaczmarski (2–6)
- Georges Brassens, translated by J. Kaczmarski (1)

Music:

- Jacek Kaczmarski (2, 3, 5)
- Georges Brassens (1)
- Przemysław Gintrowski (4, 6)

No.	Title	Duration
1.	"Grajek"	03:13
2.	"Ballada o istotkach"	02:16
3.	"Ballada o wesołym miasteczku"	03:01
4.	"Wykopaliska"	02:02
5.	"Konfesjonał"	03:31
6.	"Requiem rozbiorowe"	11:29

==== Litania i inne piosenki (2004) ====
This CD was included with the poetry book Tunel and also distributed alongside the Vilcacora supplement. The recordings come from a session at the Large Studio of Radio Wrocław (June and July 2001).

Releases:

- 2004 – Tower Press sp. z.o.o.

Lyrics: Jacek Kaczmarski

Music:

- Jacek Kaczmarski (1–6, 8)
- Przemysław Gintrowski (7)

No.	Title	Duration
1.	"Dzwon"^[a]	01:43
2.	"Młody las"	02:39
3.	"Aleksander Wat"	03:11
4.	"Litania"	02:05
5.	"Nasza klasa '92"	03:07
6.	"Ballada żebracza"	03:20
7.	"Wykopaliska"	02:02
8.	"Konfesjonał"	03:31

==== Płytoteka Dziennika: Poeci piosenki – Jacek Kaczmarski (2007) ====
This CD was included with Dziennik on March 22, 2007, and contains ten songs from albums released by Pomaton EMI.

Releases:

- 2007 – Axel Springer (CD, catalog no. 1895674447)

No.	Title	Album/Source	Duration
1.	"Nasza klasa"	Live	05:00
2.	"Listy"	Chicago Live ’83	03:16
3.	"Rejtan, czyli raport ambasadora"	Muzeum	03:08
4.	"Sen Katarzyny II"	Strącanie aniołów	02:04
5.	"Zbroja"	Live	05:11
6.	"Obława"	Live	03:19
7.	"Encore, jeszcze raz"	Strącanie aniołów	04:35
8.	"Mury"	Mury w Muzeum Raju	05:15
9.	"Źródło"	Strącanie aniołów	03:32
10.	"Epitafium dla Włodzimierza Wysockiego"	Live	10:32

==== Gazeta Wyborcza: Mury i inne ballady (2009) ====
This CD was included with Gazeta Wyborcza on April 9, 2009. It features Kaczmarski's most famous songs, recorded on December 22, 2000, during a concert at Piwnica Artystyczna "Pod Harendą" in Warsaw (the same concert that was used for the Dwadzieścia (5) lat później album). The exception is track 10 (Mury), which was recorded during a concert in South Africa in 1985.

Releases:

- 2009 – AKWAM, sp. z o.o. (CD, catalog no. 0860908440)

Lyrics: Jacek Kaczmarski

Music:

- Jacek Kaczmarski (1–4, 6–9)
- Zbigniew Łapiński (5),
- Lluís Llach y Grande (10)

No.	Title	Duration
1.	"Nasza klasa"	03:47
2.	"Sen Katarzyny II"	02:16
3.	"Jałta"	03:38
4.	"Krzyk"	01:56
5.	"Czerwony autobus"	02:09
6.	"Między nami"	04:33
7.	"Źródło"	04:02
8.	"Niech..."	04:58
9.	"Obława"	02:50
10.	"Mury"	05:02

== Compilation releases ==
- Syn marnotrawny (2004)
- Suplement (2006)
- Mała Arka Noego (2007)
- Arka Noego (2007)
- Scena to dziwna... 1980–2001 (2008)
- Jacek Kaczmarski na żywo i w studio (2011). This four-disc album, released by J.C. Koncert, was published in 2011 to commemorate Jacek Kaczmarski's birthday. It includes previously released albums Świadectwo (2006), two parts of Trasa koncertowa '97 (2008), and is enhanced by a CD from the band Trio Łódzko-Chojnowskie, containing a live concert recording from the Polish Radio studio in Gdańsk.
- Ze sceny (2012)

== Jacek Kaczmarski (or Trio) in Concerts with Other Artists ==
=== Jacek Kaczmarski (or Trio) on Compilations Related to the I Przegląd Piosenki Prawdziwej ===
==== Zakazane piosenki (1981) ====
Releases:

- 1981 – Radio "Solidarność" / Radiowa Agencja "Solidarność" Gdańsk.

No.	Performer	Title
Vol. 1
8.	Jacek Kaczmarski	"Obława"
Vol. 2
9.	Jacek Kaczmarski, Przemysław Gintrowski, Zbigniew Łapiński	"Arka Noego", "Pokolenie"
11.	Jacek Kaczmarski, Przemysław Gintrowski, Zbigniew Łapiński	"Dziady"

==== Piosenki Solidarności (Songs of Solidarity) (1981) ====
A two-vinyl set featuring songs from the I Przegląd Piosenki Prawdziwej, which took place on August 20–22, 1981, at the Olivia Hall in Gdańsk.

Releases:

- 1981 – ECHO Original Country Recording, 1981 USA, E 901–2

No.	Performer	Title
Vol. 2
2.	Jacek Kaczmarski	"Rejtan, czyli raport ambasadora"

==== Niech żyje wojna (1984) ====
- 1984 – Oficyna, Szczecin (catalog no. OK-001)

No.	Performer	Title
6.	Jacek Kaczmarski	"Obława"
17.	Jacek Kaczmarski	"Świadkowie"
19.	Jacek Kaczmarski, Przemysław Gintrowski, Zbigniew Łapiński	"Arka Noego"

==== Zakazane piosenki (2001) ====
A set of three CDs containing songs and sketches from the I Przegląd Piosenki Prawdziwej. A shorter, single-disc version was also available.

Releases:

- 2001 – Biuro Organizacyjne Przeglądu Piosenki Prawdziwej Zakazane Piosenki

No.	Performer	Title
CD2
3.	Jacek Kaczmarski	"Rejtan, czyli raport ambasadora"^[b]
Wersja jednopłytowa
8.	Jacek Kaczmarski	"Rejtan, czyli raport ambasadora"

==== I Przegląd Piosenki Prawdziwej 1981 (2014) ====
Releases:

- 2014 – Polskie Radio S.A.

No.	Performer	Title	Duration
CD1
1.	Jacek Kaczmarski, Przemysław Gintrowski, Zbigniew Łapiński	"Modlitwa o wschodzie słońca"	03:32
2.	Jacek Kaczmarski, Przemysław Gintrowski, Zbigniew Łapiński	"Arka Noego"	03:27
23.	Jacek Kaczmarski	"Obława"	02:48
24.	Jacek Kaczmarski	"Świadkowie"	04:44
CD2
20.	Jacek Kaczmarski, Przemysław Gintrowski, Zbigniew Łapiński	"Mury"	05:19

=== Góra Szybowcowa (1991) ===
An outdoor concert held on September 21–22, 1991, recorded at Góra Szybowcowa in Jelenia Góra.

Releases:

- 1991 – Jacek Music (CD, JMC 06)

No.	Performer	Title
16.	Jacek Kaczmarski	"Ballada żebracza"

=== Dwie Sarmacje (2005) ===
A concert by Jacek Kaczmarski and Jacek Kowalski, performed on January 19, 1995. The album was included as a supplement to the magazine Christianitas (no. 23/24) in December 2005.

Releases:

- 2005 – Fundacja św. Benedykta

Performers:

- Jacek Kaczmarski – vocals, guitar (odd-numbered tracks and tracks 1 and 17),
- Jacek Kowalski – vocals, guitar (even-numbered tracks and tracks 1 and 17)

Lyrics:

- Jacek Kaczmarski (odd-numbered tracks and track 1)
- Jacek Kowalski (even-numbered tracks and track 1)
- Juliusz Słowacki (17)

Music:

- Jacek Kaczmarski (odd-numbered tracks),
- Jacek Kowalski (even-numbered tracks)
- Andrzej Kurylewicz (17)

No.	Performer	Title	Duration
1.	Jacek Kaczmarski, Jacek Kowalski	"Polonez biesiadny"	04:13
2.	Jacek Kowalski	"O tej muzyce"	03:08
3.	Jacek Kaczmarski	"Do Muzy suplikacja przy ostrzeniu pióra"	02:25
4.	Jacek Kowalski	"Psalm rodowodowy"	02:42
5.	Jacek Kaczmarski	"Drzewo genealogiczne"	04:38
6.	Jacek Kowalski	"Nagrobek mojemu dziadkowi"	02:52
7.	Jacek Kaczmarski	"Dobre rady Pana Ojca"	03:12
8.	Jacek Kowalski	"Oświadczyny i przyjęcie"	03:10
9.	Jacek Kaczmarski	"Elekcja"	03:43
10.	Jacek Kowalski	"Pieśń o bitwie pod Mozgawą"	04:03
11.	Jacek Kaczmarski	"Pan Kmicic"	03:45
12.	Jacek Kowalski	"Berestecką potrzebą Apollo śpiewa"	02:03
13.	Jacek Kaczmarski	"Krajobraz po uczcie"	03:22
14.	Jacek Kowalski	"Taniec śmierci"	02:40
15.	Jacek Kaczmarski	"Zbroja"	04:39
16.	Jacek Kowalski	"Pieśń neobarska"	02:05
17.	Jacek Kaczmarski, Jacek Kowalski	"Pieśń konfederatów"	05:15

== Jacek Kaczmarski in Various Artists Compilations ==
=== Piosenka na wskroś optymistyczna (1980) ===
Releases:

- 1980 – Tonpress (catalog no. TK-10)

No.	Performer	Title
12.	Jacek Kaczmarski, Piotr Gierak	"Obława"

=== Szukam przyjaciela (1980) ===
Releases:

- 1980 – Tonpress (catalog no. TK-35)

No.	Performer	Title
9.	Jacek Kaczmarski, Piotr Gierak	"Przypowieść o ślepcach"^[c]

=== Postulat 22 – nowe polskie pieśni robotnicze (1980) ===
This album was distributed during the Nobel Prize ceremony for Czesław Miłosz in Stockholm.

Releases:

- 1980 – Safran 78 (catalog no.. SAF 7819, Sweden)
- 1981 – Folkways Records (catalog no. FW37251, USA)
- 1981 – Eigel Stein (catalog no. ES 1011, West Germany)

No.	Performer	Title
7.	Jacek Kaczmarski	"Krajobraz po uczcie"

=== Piosenka Studencka 1978 – 1982 (1987) ===
A set of two cassettes released by Akademickie Radio Pomorze (ARP). In 2002, the contents were reissued on CD by Jacek Music.

Releases:

- 1987 – Akademickie Radio Pomorze (catalog no. ARP 050/1, ARP 050/2)
- 1992 – Jacek Music (catalog no. JMK16) (kaseta)
- 2002 – Jacek Music (catalog no. JMC20) (CD)

No.	Performer	Title
Vol. 1
1.	Jacek Kaczmarski, Piotr Gierak	"Przedszkole"
13.	Jacek Kaczmarski	"Ze sceny"
Vol. 2
5.	Jacek Kaczmarski	"Mury"
15.	Jacek Kaczmarski	"Epitafium dla Włodzimierza Wysockiego"
CD
1.	Jacek Kaczmarski, Piotr Gierak	"Przedszkole"
8.	Jacek Kaczmarski	"Ze sceny"
14.	Jacek Kaczmarski	"Mury"
19.	Jacek Kaczmarski	"Epitafium dla Włodzimierza Wysockiego"

=== O! Polskie piosenki (1998) ===
A five-CD album.

Releases:

- 1998 – Polskie Radio S.A.

No.	Performer	Title
CD5
18.	Jacek Kaczmarski	"Obława"

=== Ballady z krainy zamyślenia (1999) ===
A compilation of ballads and poetic songs from the student music and sung poetry movement of the 1970s and 1980s.

Releases:

- 1999 – Karolex (catalog no. PTCD 006)

No.	Performer	Title
11.	Jacek Kaczmarski	"Ballada żebracza"

=== Solidarność 1980–2000 (2000) ===
A collection of songs from the early "Solidarity" period and martial law, as well as songs by young authors from the 1990s that reference that era. The album was included with the publication Solidarność 1980–2000.

Releases:

- 2000 – Stowarzyszenie Pokolenie, Górnośląskie Centrum Kultury

Performer	Title
Jacek Kaczmarski	"Mury"
Jacek Kaczmarski	"Powrót sentymentalnej panny S."

=== Jubileusz 40-lecia – Studencki Festiwal Piosenki 1962–2002 (2002) ===
Releases:

- 2002 – Radio Kraków

No.	Performer	Title
CD1
2.	Jacek Kaczmarski	"Lekcja historii klasycznej"

=== Hybrydy 1957–2002 (2002) ===
A set of four CDs showcasing the history of the student club Hybrydy in Warsaw.

Releases:

- 2002 – Warner Music Poland, Polskie Radio (catalog no. 5046626452)

No.	Performer	Title
CD3
25.	Jacek Kaczmarski, Przemysław Gintrowski, Zbigniew Łapiński	"Źródło"

=== Pamiętajcie o ogrodach (2003) ===
Part of the Polskie perły series, featuring the best works of Polish song classics.

Releases:

- 2003 – Polskie Nagrania (catalog no. PNCD 799)

No.	Performer	Title
10.	Jacek Kaczmarski	"Przedszkole"

=== Gitarą i piórem 2 (2003) ===
A compilation of songs featured in the radio show Gitarą i piórem, hosted by Janusz Deblessem on Program III of Polish Radio.

Releases:

- 2003 – Polskie Radio (catalog no. 5046697702)

No.	Performer	Title
CD3
15.	Jacek Kaczmarski, Przemysław Gintrowski, Zbigniew Łapiński	"Źródło (Wąwóz)"

=== Laureaci Przeglądu Piosenki Aktorskiej Wrocław 1976–2003 (2004) ===
Releases:

- 2004 – Pomaton EMI (catalog no. 7292832)

Performer	Title
Jacek Kaczmarski, Przemysław Gintrowski, Zbigniew Łapiński	"Kantyczka z lotu ptaka"

== Notes ==
^[a]This song is also known under the title "Ballada o dzwonniku."

^[b]On the album, the song is mistakenly listed under the title "Caryca"

^[c]This song is also known under the title "Ślepcy."
