= Live from Gdańsk (Koncert w Stoczni) =

Live From Gdańsk (Koncert w Stoczni)

Live album by Jean-Michel Jarre
- Released: 27 October 2005
- Recorded: 26 August 2005
- Venue: Gdańsk Shipyard, Gdańsk, Poland
- Genre: Electronic
- Length: 48:03
- Label: Warner Music Poland
- Producer: Jean-Michel Jarre

Jean-Michel Jarre chronology
Jarre in China (2005)	Live From Gdańsk (Koncert w Stoczni) (2005)	Live Printemps de Bourges 2002 (2006)

Live From Gdańsk (Koncert w Stoczni) (pol. "Shipyard Concert", referring to Gdańsk Shipyard) is a live album by Jean-Michel Jarre, released in 2005, exclusively in Poland. It contains selected songs performed during Jarre's Space of Freedom concert in Gdańsk, Poland, on 26 August 2005, commemorating twenty-five years of the Solidarity movement.

Jean-Michel Jarre performed together with Polish Baltic Philharmonic and Gdańsk University Choir.

Apart from his own works, the album also features Jarre's electronic-style interpretation of Polish protest song "Mury", written by Jacek Kaczmarski in 1978, to the melody of "L'estaca" by Lluís Llach.

== Cover art ==
Cover art features shipyard cranes in the foreground, then a photograph of Gdańsk Shipyard workers, and wooden tablets of 21 demands of MKS in the background.

== Critical reception ==
Fans complained about the length of the album, which contains only nine out of twenty-four songs performed during the event. In their review, Polish magazine Teraz Rock described this release as "undoubtedly too short".

== Track listing (DVD) ==
Note: Jean-Michel Jarre has a long practice of changing the names of his songs when performing them live (see the list of Jean-Michel Jarre compositions with multiple titles for details). In such case, original name is indicated below the new one.

Solidarność Live

1. "Shipyard Overture"
  - original title: "Industrial Revolution Overture"
2. "Suite for Flute"
3. "Oxygene 2"
4. "Tribute To Chopin"
5. "Aero"
6. "Oxygene 4"
7. "Souvenir"
  - original title: "Souvenir of China"
8. "Space of Freedom"
  - original title: "March 23"
9. "Theremin Memories"
10. "Chronologie 2"
11. "Mury"
12. "Chronologie 6"
13. "Oxygene 8"
14. "Light My Sky"
  - original title: "Tout Est Bleu"
15. "Tribute to Jean Paul II"
  - original title: "Acropolis"
16. "Rendez-Vous 2"
17. "Vivaldi: Summer – Presto"
18. "Oxygene 12"
19. "Rendez-Vous 4"
20. "Solidarność"
  - original title: "Oxygene 13"
21. "Aerology (Remix)"

== Track listing (CD) ==
1. "Shipyard Overture" – 4:59
  - original title: "Industrial Revolution: Overture"
2. "Oxygene 4" – 4:21
3. "Mury" – 5:49
4. "Space of Freedom" – 5:01
  - original title: "March 23"
5. "Oxygene 8" – 4:45
6. "Light My Sky" – 4:51
  - original title: "Tout Est Bleu"
7. "Tribute to John Paul II" – 6:24
  - original title: "Akropolis"
8. "Rendez-vous 4" – 6:20
9. "Aerology Remix" – 5:15

== Personnel ==
- Jean-Michel Jarre – keyboards, mixing desk, laser harp, theremin, vocals
- Francis Rimbert – keyboards, electronic percussions
- Claude Samard – keyboards, guitars, musical coordinator
- Polish Baltic Philharmonic
- Gdańsk University Choir
- Michal Nesterowicz – conductor

== Certification and sales ==
Region	Certification	Certified units/sales
Poland (ZPAV)	Platinum	31,000
