= Przemysław Gintrowski =

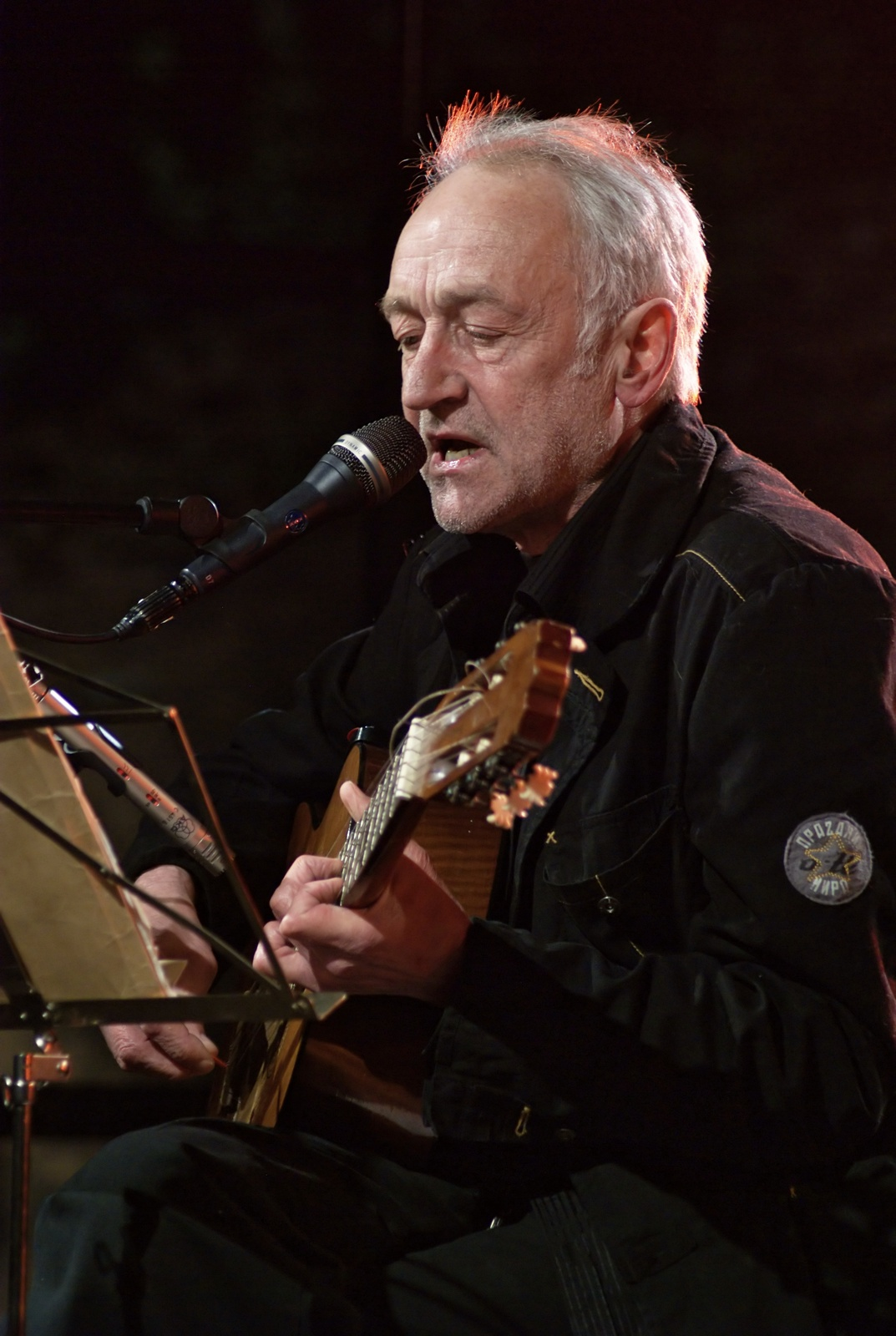
- Przemysław Gintrowski in 2009

Background information
- Born: 21 December 1951; Stargard Szczeciński, Poland
- Died: 20 October 2012 (aged 60); Warsaw, Poland
- Genres: Sung poetry
- Occupation(s): Composer, musician
- Years active: 1976–2012
- Website: gintrowski.art.pl

Przemysław Adam Gintrowski (21 December 1951 – 20 October 2012) was a Polish composer and musician.

Gintrowski debuted in 1976 on a review of the Warsaw Riviera with the song "Epitaph for Sergei Yesenin". Shortly afterwards, in 1979, he formed a trio with Jacek Kaczmarski and Zbigniew Łapiński, and initiated a poetic programme "Mury" ("Walls"). The title song of the programme, "Mury", based on the song written by Catalan bard Lluis Llach L'Estaca – became an informal anthem of the Polish trade union Solidarity and the symbol of the fight against the regime. Other programs they created were "Raj" (Paradise) and "Museum".

With the declaration of martial law in December 1981 Trio broke up – Jacek Kaczmarski remained in exile in France, and Gintrowski started his own artistic activity. He made his debut as a composer of film music – during the next ten years he created music for over twenty fictional films and serials.

Gintrowski's songs were based on texts by Jacek Kaczmarski, Zbigniew Herbert, Tomasz Jastrun, Krzysztof Maria Sieniawski, Jerzy Czech, Tadeusz Nowak and Marek Tercz.

For many years he did not record his own songs, although he still composed them for other artists and prepared music for films. For example, he created sound tracks for Andrzej Wajda's Man of Iron, Mother of Kings by Janusz Zaorski, and Stanisław Bareja's mid-1980s comedy series "Zmiennicy" (Shiftworkers). Gintrowski recorded another album entitled "Kanapka z człowiekiem" ("Human sandwich") that contained older material as well as some brand new songs.

On 31 August 2006 he was awarded by President Lech Kaczyński with The Order of Polonia Restituta.
