= Zbigniew Łapiński =

Polish musician (1947–2018)

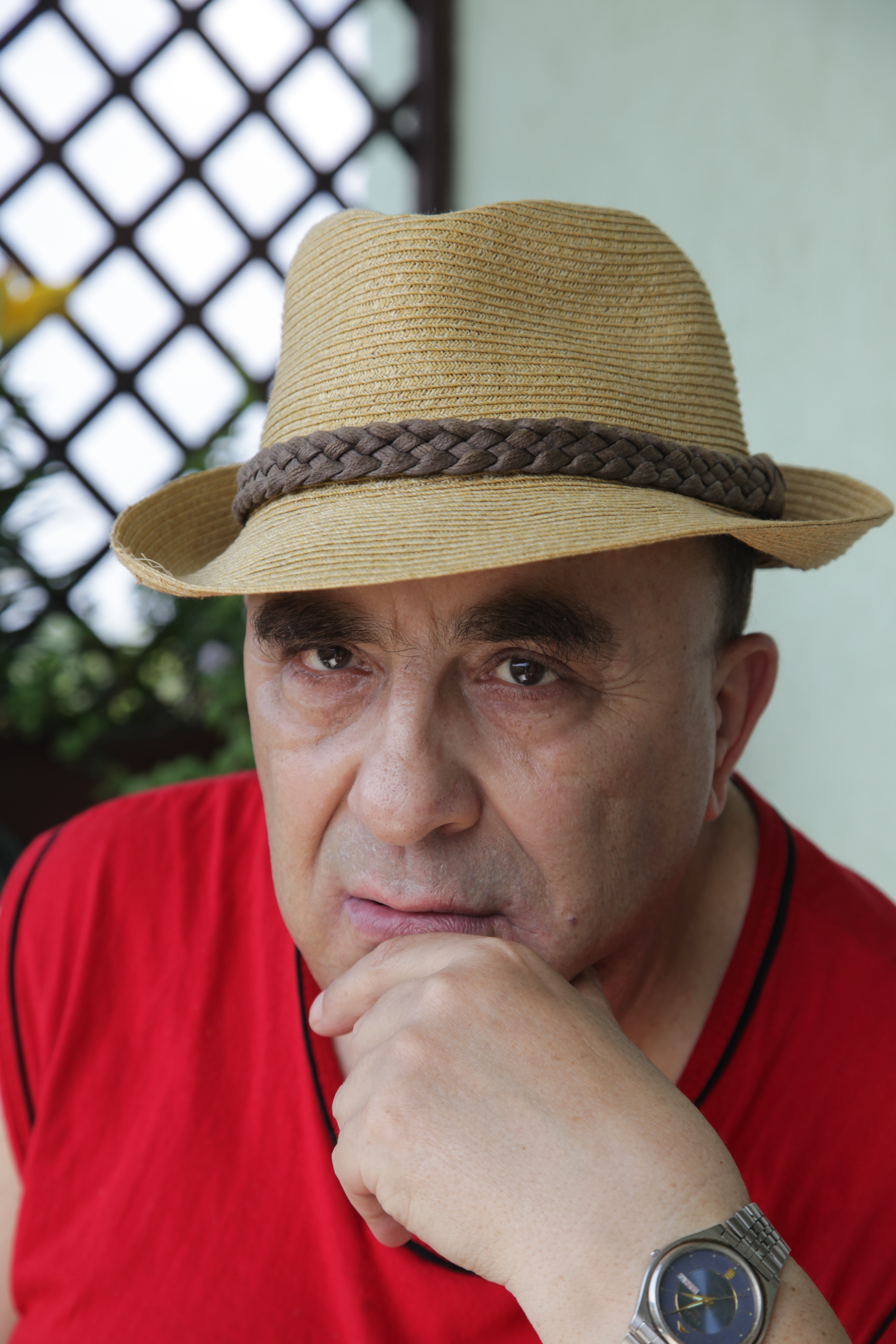
- Zbigniew Łapiński in 2013

Background information
- Born: 12 November 1947; Warsaw, Poland
- Died: 2 April 2018 (aged 70) Warsaw, Poland
- Genre: Sung poetry
- Occupations: Musician, composer, pianist, accompanist, arranger, conductor
- Instrument: Piano
- Years active: 1970s–2005
- Website: zbigniewlapinski.pl

Zbigniew Janusz Łapiński (12 November 1947 – 2 April 2018) was a Polish musician, composer, pianist, accompanist, arranger, and conductor.

== Biography ==
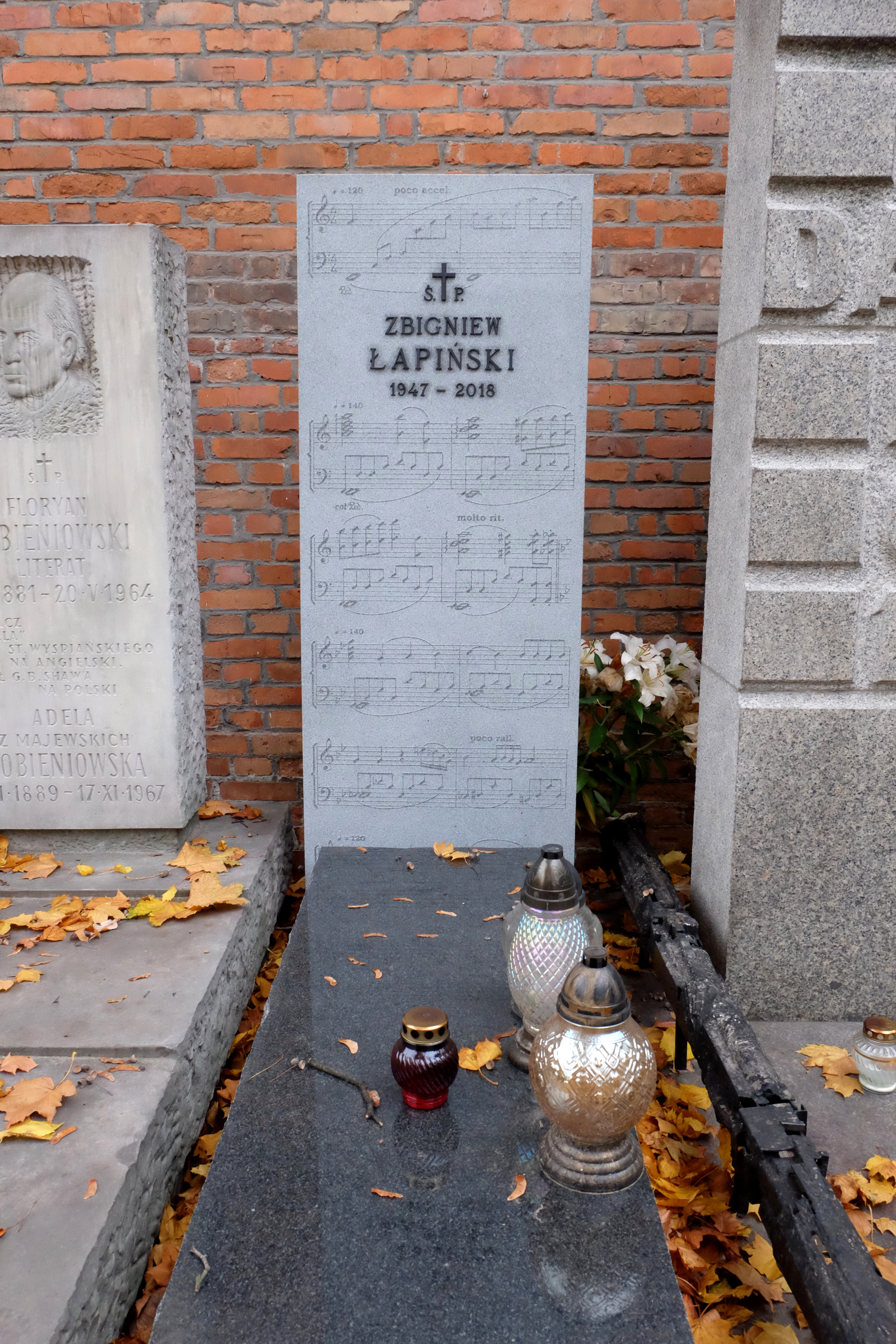
Grave of Zbigniew Łapiński at Powązki Cemetery.

He was best known for his collaboration with Przemysław Gintrowski and Jacek Kaczmarski. He also worked with the band Czerwony Tulipan, as well as with Kuba Sienkiewicz, contributing to three of Sienkiewicz's solo albums and performing with him in acoustic concerts. Lapiński also took part in concerts and studio recordings with Mirosław Czyżykiewicz.

Together with Jørn Simen Øverli, he recorded two albums: the first featuring songs by the Kaczmarski-Gintrowski-Lapiński trio and other Polish poets; the second, a set of Vladimir Vysotsky’s songs translated into Norwegian, which won the 1989 Spellemannprisen.

In November 2005, he suffered a stroke and withdrew from professional life.

He died on April 2, 2018 and was buried in the Avenue of the Meritorious at Powązki Cemetery in Warsaw.

== Honors ==
In 1999, he was awarded the honorary badge Meritorious Activist of Culture. On October 15, 2004, was awarded the Gold Cross of Merit. In August 2006, President Lech Kaczyński presented him with the Knight's Cross of the Order of Polonia Restituta. In 2016, he was awarded the Gloria Artis Medal for Merit to Culture.

== Works ==
Compositions by Lapiński (together with Jacek Kaczmarski, anthologized under the listed section titles):

- Akompaniator (Varia 1982–2002)
- Bajka średniowieczna (Wojna postu z karnawałem)
- Bankierzy (Wojna postu z karnawałem)
- Chrystus i kupcy (Raj)
- Czary skuteczne na swary odwieczne (Sarmatia)
- Czerwony Autobus (Muzeum)
- Dobre rady Pana Ojca (Sarmatia)
- Dylemat (90 dni spokoju)
- Dzieci Hioba (Dzieci Hioba)
- Dzielnica żebraków (Sarmatia)
- Epitafium dla Sowizdrzała (Wojna postu z karnawałem)
- Hiob (Raj)
- Jak długo grać będą… (Szukamy stajenki)
- Karmaniola (90 dni spokoju)
- Kolęda barokowa (Szukamy stajenki)
- Kolęda ludowa (Szukamy stajenki)
- Kołysanka [1993] (Szukamy stajenki)
- Koniec wojny trzydziestoletniej (Wojna postu z karnawałem)
- Meldunek (Krzyk)
- Nie widzą, nie wiedzą (Szukamy stajenki)
- Poranek (Wojna postu z karnawałem)
- Portret zbiorowy w zabytkowym wnętrzu (Wojna postu z karnawałem)
- Powrót z Syberii (Muzeum)
- Prosty człowiek (Sarmatia)
- Pusty raj (Raj)
- Pustynia ’80 (Krzyk)
- Rokosz (Sarmatia)
- Rozmowa (Wojna postu z karnawałem)
- Scena to dziwna… (Szukamy stajenki)
- Somosierra (Muzeum)
- Straszny rwetes, bracie ośle… (Szukamy stajenki)
- Szturm (Muzeum)
- Targ (Niewolnicy)
- Tyle złota i purpury… (Szukamy stajenki)
- Upadek Związku Radzieckiego (Pięć sonetów o umieraniu komunizmu)
- W kołysce Ziemi Obiecanej… (Szukamy stajenki)
- Wariacje dla Grażynki (Muzeum)
- Wigilia na Syberii (Muzeum)
- Wiosna 1905 (Muzeum)
- Władca Ciemności (Raj)
- Z pasa słuckiego pożytek (Sarmatia)
- Zrodził się dzieciaczek… (Szukamy stajenki)
