= Zieleniak =

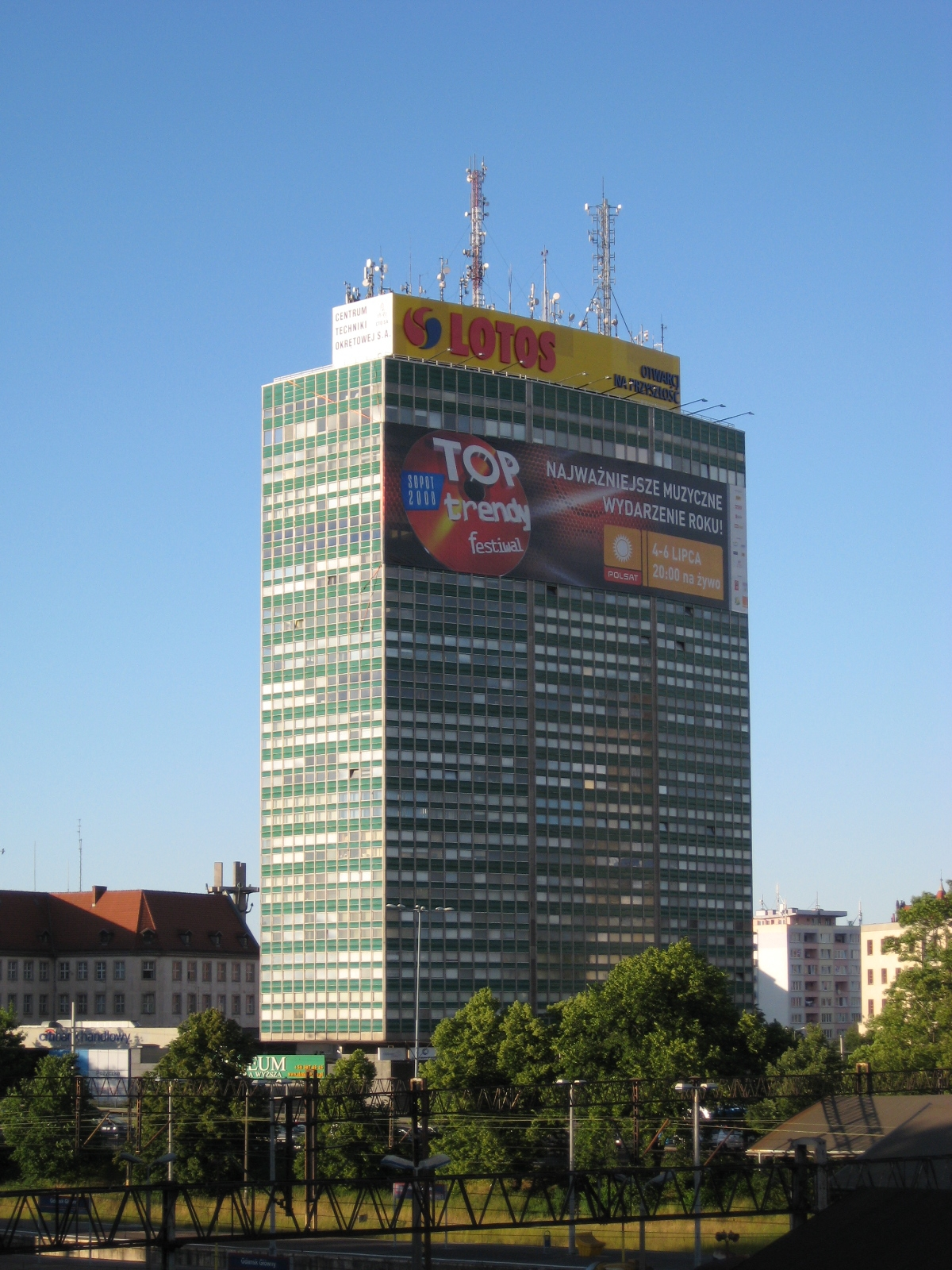
- Zieleniak in 2008
- Interactive map of the Zieleniak area

General information
- Location: ul. Wały Piastowskie 1 Śródmieście, Gdańsk
- Coordinates: 54.35852°N 18.64654°E
- Year built: 1966–1971
- Opened: 15 December 1971
- Owner: Centrum Techniki Okrętowej S.A.

Height
- Tip: 90 m (300 ft)
- Roof: 72 m (236 ft)

Technical details
- Floor count: 17
- Floor area: 18,300 m^{2} (197,000 ft^{2})

Design and construction
- Architects: Stanisław Tobolczyk; Jasna Strzałkowska

Website
- zieleniak.pl

Zieleniak (lit. 'the Green One') is a skyscraper and office building located in central Gdańsk. It is the fourth-tallest building in the city.

== Architectural specifications ==
Zieleniak measures 72 metres (236 ft) up to its roof, and 90 metres (300 ft) up to the tip of its masts. It has 18,300 m^{2} (197,000 ft^{2}) of floor area, mostly used for offices; however, a restaurant is also present on the 16th floor.

== History ==
The building was constructed from 1966 to 1971 for the Centre for Ship Technology (Polish: Centrum Techniki Okrętowej; CTO) and opened formally on 15 December 1971. Its architects were Stanisław Tobolczyk of the Warsaw University of Technology and Jasna Strzałkowska of Miastoprojekt Warszawa. Construction began with the creation of two reinforced concrete pillars going up to the building's roof, with floors being then installed from the top down.

Although it was once the site of the headquarters of many large companies, some taking up whole floors, today, most companies in the building have only 40 m^{2} (430 ft^{2}) of space on average. The CTO eventually moved out of it in the 2010s. A 2021 article stated: "Zieleniak's glory days are long behind it and it deserves a general renovation. [...] The office building's unique construction causes even a simple change of windows to be impossible."

Many proposals have been put forward to rebuild or demolish the often aesthetically controversial building, but have been criticized by local residents, as Zieleniak has become an important element of Gdańsk's skyline. In 2011, the State Treasury attempted to sell the building, but the sale was ultimately unsuccessful and ended in 2014. Another unsuccessful proposal, put forward in 2020 by an architecture student, proposed rebuilding it as a striking Gothic tower.
