= Mury (song) =

1978 sung poetry protest song written by Jacek Kaczmarski

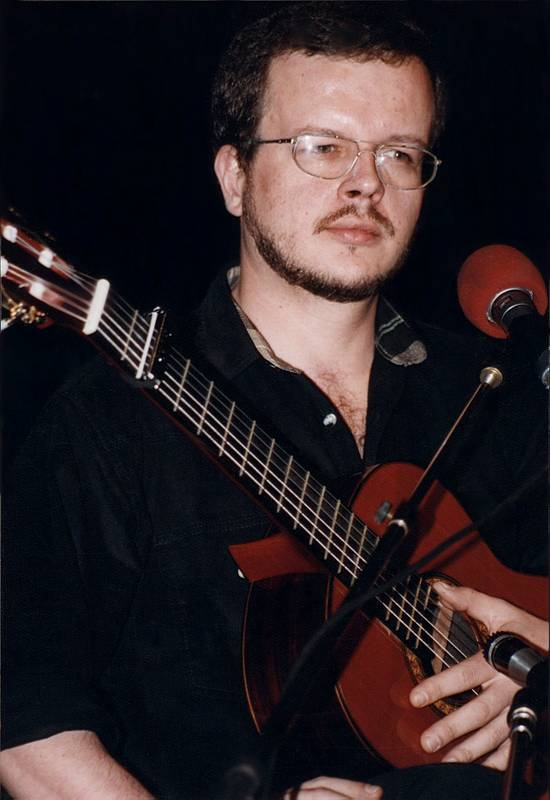
Song writer and singer Jacek Kaczmarski

Mury (Walls) was a sung poetry protest song written by Polish singer Jacek Kaczmarski in 1978. It was especially popular among the members of Solidarity (NSZZ Solidarność) and is one of Kaczmarski's best known songs. It became a powerful symbol of the opposition to the communist regime in the People's Republic of Poland and was sung at countless rallies, meetings, protests and strikes throughout Poland during the 1980s. It has become popular among protesters in the aftermath of the 2020 Belarusian presidential election.

From May 2024, a typescript of the song from the collection of the National Library of Poland is presented at a permanent exhibition in the Palace of the Commonwealth.

== Inspiration ==
The lyrics for Mury were written in 1978 to the melody of the song L'Estaca by the Catalan singer Lluís Llach, which Kaczmarski heard on one of several Spanish records he borrowed from a friend in December of that year. The intention of Kaczmarski's lyrics was to examine how a song or poem can cease to become the 'property' of the author after it is 'stolen' by the masses, who may appropriate it for a particular cause even if it wasn't the author's intention in the first place. In this context, the song can be interpreted as supporting the Polish or Catalan struggle for independence, but also as a critique of certain aspects of mass social movements.

== Solidarity's anthem ==
Despite its pessimistic conclusion (A mury rosły, rosły…, "And the walls grew, grew…") and, ironically, despite Kaczmarski's intention to criticise social movements for sometimes 'stealing' the words of an artist, the song's message of struggling for independence against oppression meant that Mury quickly gained protest song status and it was soon accepted nationwide as the unofficial anthem of Solidarity. Its refrain (Wyrwij murom zęby krat!, "Pull out like teeth the bars from the walls!") later became the signal of the underground Radio Solidarity and the most popular part of the song, while its last pessimistic part was often left out. Kaczmarski came to see this phenomenon as both a misunderstanding of the song's meaning and a vindication of the point he was making when he wrote it. Nonetheless it remains one of his most popular songs.

In 1987, after several years of severe repression by the communist regime in the People's Republic of Poland had managed to erode some of the support for Solidarity, and before the Polish Round Table Agreement of 1989, Kaczmarski expressed his disappointment with the disillusionment he saw in Polish society by writing 'Mury '87'. In this song, which is set to the same melody and which Kaczmarski referred to as an 'antonym' of 'Mury', he argues that instead of singing and hoping, people need to be taking action once again.

In 2005, 'Mury' was performed by Jean Michel Jarre jointly with the Gdańsk University Choir and the Polish Baltic Philharmonic during the concert Przestrzeń Wolności (Space of Freedom, 26 August 2005) on the occasion of the 25th anniversary of the formation of Solidarity.

== See also ==
- L'estaca
- Żeby Polska była Polską
