= Jacek Kaczmarski =

Polish singer, songwriter, poet and author

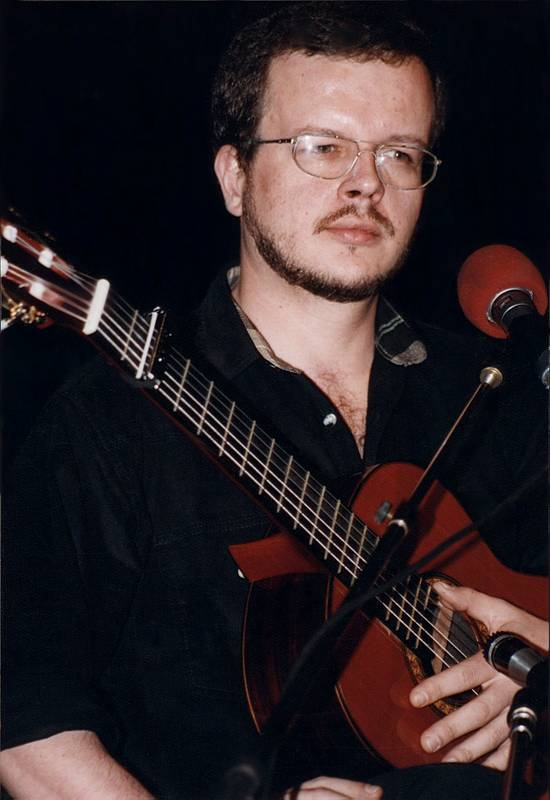
- Jacek Kaczmarski in 1992

Background information
- Born: 22 March 1957; Warsaw, Poland
- Died: 10 April 2004 (aged 47) Gdańsk, Poland
- Genre: Sung poetry
- Occupations: Singer, songwriter, poet, author
- Instrument: Classical guitar
- Years active: 1977–2004
- Website: kaczmarski.art.pl

Jacek Marcin Kaczmarski ['jat͡sɛk kat͡ʂˈmarskʲi] (22 March 1957 – 10 April 2004) was a Polish singer, songwriter, poet and author.

== Life ==
He was the son of painter Anna Trojanowska-Kaczmarska, a Pole of Jewish background, and the artist Janusz Kaczmarski.

Kaczmarski was a voice of the Solidarity trade union movement in 1980s Poland. His songs criticized the ruling communist regime and appealed to the tradition of patriotic resistance within Poles. He remains best known for his protest songs on social and political subjects ("Mury" (Walls) based on "L'Estaca" by Lluís Llach, "Obława" (Wolf hunt (lit. Raid))). However, his commentary was not restricted to contemporary politics, and his texts' themes have retained their relevance in Polish culture beyond the collapse of the Soviet Union and its communist bloc.

He made his debut in 1977 at the Student Song Festival, where he was awarded first prize for his work "Obława" based on the song "Охота на волков" by Vladimir Vysotsky. In 1980 he won second prize at the Opole Song Festival for "Epitafium dla Włodzimierza Wysockiego" (Epitaph for Vladimir Vysotsky).

Kaczmarski was on tour in France when the martial law was declared in Poland in December 1981. He lived in exile until 1990. During these years he gave concerts in Western Europe, the United States, Canada, Australia, South Africa, and Israel. From 1982 on, he worked as an editor and journalist with Radio Free Europe and hosted his own radio program, "Kwadrans Jacka Kaczmarskiego" (Fifteen Minutes with Jacek Kaczmarski).

After his return to Poland (following the Round Table negotiations that brought an end to communist rule) he toured the country with his friend, artist Zbigniew Łapiński. The tour was recorded and released as Live, and it achieved Gold album status in 2001. His other albums included "Mury" (Walls), "Nasza klasa" (Our Class), "Raj" (Paradise), "Muzeum" (Museum), "Pochwała łotrostwa" (In Praise of Villainy), "Wojna postu z karnawałem" (The War between Carnival and Lent). However, Kaczmarski was soon disillusioned by the developments in Poland after 1989 and eventually emigrated to Australia.

Kaczmarski was known not only for his politically motivated lyrics but also for his characteristically dynamic – even aggressive – classical guitar playing, and expressive performance style. His deep knowledge of not only his nation's history but also of classical literature gave his songs a particularly deep and multi-layered resonance (e.g. "Powtórka z Odysei," recalled Homer's Odyssey, while the ballad "Lalka" masterfully retells Boleslaw Prus's second novel of the same name, The Doll.). He often performed before contrastingly different audiences: groups of friends in their homes, campus venues, and large concert halls in Poland, the rest of Europe, and America.

Kaczmarski was diagnosed with laryngeal cancer in 2002. He died in a hospital in Gdańsk in 2004.

Jacek Kaczmarski suffered from severe alcoholism, which often led to domestic violence. His wife and daughter have revealed that Kaczmarski often vented his frustration by beating them.

== Discography ==
- Mury, 1979
- Raj, 1980
- Muzeum, 1981
- Krzyk, 1981
- Strącanie aniołów, 1982
- Carmagnole, 1982
- Chicago – Live, 1983
- Litania, 1987
- Kosmopolak, 1987
- Dzieci Hioba, 1989
- Głupi Jasio, 1990
- Live, 1990
- Mury w Muzeum Raju, 1991
- Bankiet, 1992
- Wojna postu z karnawałem, 1992
- Sarmatia, 1993
- Szukamy stajenki, 1993
- Pochwała łotrostwa, 1995
- Między nami, 1997
- Koncert '97, 1997
- Dwie Skały, 1999 POL No. 37
- Dwadzieścia (5) lat później, 2000 POL #26
- Mimochodem, 2001 POL #18
- Złota kolekcja: Jacek Kaczmarski – Źródło, 2003 POL #8
- Syn marnotrawny, 2004 (Box set) POL #15
- Świadectwo, 2005 POL #25
- Suplement, 2006 (Box set) POL #47
- Mała Arka Noego, 2007 (Box set)
- Arka Noego, 2007 (Box set)
- Scena to dziwna, 2008 (Box set)
- In Memoriam, 2014 POL #9

== See also ==
- List of Poles
- Jacek Kaczmarski's discography
